= Stability spectrum =

In model theory, a branch of mathematical logic, a complete first-order theory T is called stable in λ (an infinite cardinal number), if the Stone space of every model of T of size ≤ λ has itself size ≤ λ. T is called a stable theory if there is no upper bound for the cardinals κ such that T is stable in κ. The stability spectrum of T is the class of all cardinals κ such that T is stable in κ.

For countable theories there are only four possible stability spectra. The corresponding dividing lines are those for total transcendentality, superstability and stability. This result is due to Saharon Shelah, who also defined stability and superstability.

== The stability spectrum theorem for countable theories ==
Theorem. Every countable complete first-order theory T falls into one of the following classes:

- T is stable in λ for all infinite cardinals λ—T is totally transcendental.
- T is stable in λ exactly for all cardinals λ with λ ≥ 2^{ω}—T is superstable but not totally transcendental.
- T is stable in λ exactly for all cardinals λ that satisfy λ = λ^{ω}—T is stable but not superstable.
- T is not stable in any infinite cardinal λ—T is unstable.

The condition on λ in the third case holds for cardinals of the form λ = κ^{ω}, but not for cardinals λ of cofinality ω (because λ < λ^{cof λ}).

=== Totally transcendental theories ===
A complete first-order theory T is called totally transcendental if every formula has bounded Morley rank, i.e. if RM(φ) < ∞ for every formula φ(x) with parameters in a model of T, where x may be a tuple of variables. It is sufficient to check that RM(x=x) < ∞, where x is a single variable.

For countable theories total transcendence is equivalent to stability in ω, and therefore countable totally transcendental theories are often called ω-stable for brevity. A totally transcendental theory is stable in every λ ≥ |T|, hence a countable ω-stable theory is stable in all infinite cardinals.

Every uncountably categorical countable theory is totally transcendental. This includes complete theories of vector spaces or algebraically closed fields. The theories of groups of finite Morley rank are another important example of totally transcendental theories.

=== Superstable theories ===
A complete first-order theory T is superstable if there is a rank function on complete types that has essentially the same properties as Morley rank in a totally transcendental theory. Every totally transcendental theory is superstable. A theory T is superstable if and only if it is stable in all cardinals λ ≥ 2^{|T|}.

=== Stable theories ===
A theory that is stable in one cardinal λ ≥ |T| is stable in all cardinals λ that satisfy λ = λ^{|T|}. Therefore a theory is stable if and only if it is stable in some cardinal λ ≥ |T|.

=== Unstable theories ===
Most mathematically interesting theories fall into this category, including complicated theories such as any complete extension of ZF set theory, and relatively tame theories such as the theory of real closed fields. This shows that the stability spectrum is a relatively blunt tool. To get somewhat finer results one can look at the exact cardinalities of the Stone spaces over models of size ≤ λ, rather than just asking whether they are at most λ.

== The uncountable case ==
For a general stable theory T in a possibly uncountable language, the stability spectrum is determined by two cardinals κ and λ_{0}, such that T is stable in λ exactly when λ ≥ λ_{0} and λ^{μ} = λ for all μ<κ. So λ_{0} is the smallest infinite cardinal for which T is stable. These invariants satisfy the inequalities

- κ ≤ |T|^{+}
- κ ≤ λ_{0}
- λ_{0} ≤ 2^{|T|}
- If λ_{0} > |T|, then λ_{0} ≥ 2^{ω}

When |T| is countable the 4 possibilities for its stability spectrum correspond to the following values of these cardinals:

- κ and λ_{0} are not defined: T is unstable.
- λ_{0} is 2^{ω}, κ is ω_{1}: T is stable but not superstable
- λ_{0} is 2^{ω}, κ is ω: T is superstable but not ω-stable.
- λ_{0} is ω, κ is ω: T is totally transcendental (or ω-stable)

== See also ==
- Spectrum of a theory
