= Differentially closed field =

In mathematics, a differential field K is differentially closed if every finite system of differential equations with a solution in some differential field extending K already has a solution in K. This concept was introduced by Robinson (1959). Differentially closed fields are the analogues for differential equations of algebraically closed fields for polynomial equations.

== The theory of differentially closed fields ==
We recall that a differential field is a field equipped with a derivation operator. Let K be a differential field with derivation operator ∂.

- A differential polynomial in x is a polynomial in the formal expressions x, ∂x, ∂^{2}x, ... with coefficients in K.
- The order of a non-zero differential polynomial in x is the largest n such that ∂^{n}x occurs in it, or −1 if the differential polynomial is a constant.
- The separant S_{f} of a differential polynomial of order n≥0 is the derivative of f with respect to ∂^{n}x.
- The field of constants of K is the subfield of elements a with ∂a=0.
- In a differential field K of nonzero characteristic p, all pth powers are constants. It follows that neither K nor its field of constants is perfect, unless ∂ is trivial. A field K with derivation ∂ is called differentially perfect if it is either of characteristic 0, or of characteristic p and every constant is a pth power of an element of K.
- A differentially closed field is a differentially perfect differential field K such that if f and g are differential polynomials such that S_{f}≠ 0 and g≠0 and f has order greater than that of g, then there is some x in K with f(x)=0 and g(x)≠0. (Some authors add the condition that K has characteristic 0, in which case S_{f} is automatically non-zero, and K is automatically perfect.)
- DCF_{p} is the theory of differentially closed fields of characteristic p (where p is 0 or a prime).

Taking g=1 and f any ordinary separable polynomial shows that any differentially closed field is separably closed. In characteristic 0 this implies that it is algebraically closed, but in characteristic p>0 differentially closed fields are never algebraically closed.

Unlike the complex numbers in the theory of algebraically closed fields, there is no natural example of a differentially closed field. Any differentially perfect field K has a differential closure, a prime model extension, which is differentially closed. Shelah showed that the differential closure is unique up to isomorphism over K. Shelah also showed that the prime differentially closed field of characteristic 0 (the differential closure of the rationals) is not minimal; this was a rather surprising result, as it is not what one would expect by analogy with algebraically closed fields.

The theory of DCF_{p} is complete and model complete (for p=0 this was shown by Robinson, and for p>0 by Wood (1973)). The theory DCF_{p} is the model companion of the theory of differential fields of characteristic p. It is the model completion of the theory of differentially perfect fields of characteristic p if one adds to the language a symbol giving the pth root of constants when p>0. The theory of differential fields of characteristic p>0 does not have a model completion, and in characteristic p=0 is the same as the theory of differentially perfect fields so has DCF_{0} as its model completion.

The number of differentially closed fields of some infinite cardinality κ is 2^{κ}; for κ uncountable this was proved by Shelah (1973), and for κ countable by Hrushovski and Sokolovic.

== The Kolchin topology ==
The Kolchin topology on K ^{m} is defined by taking sets of solutions of systems of differential equations over K in m variables as basic closed sets. Like the Zariski topology, the Kolchin topology is Noetherian.

A d-constructible set is a finite union of closed and open sets in the Kolchin topology. Equivalently, a d-constructible set is the set of solutions to a quantifier-free, or atomic, formula with parameters in K.

== Quantifier elimination ==
Like the theory of algebraically closed fields, the theory DCF_{0} of differentially closed fields of characteristic 0 eliminates quantifiers. The geometric content of this statement is that the projection of a d-constructible set is d-constructible. It also eliminates imaginaries, is complete, and model complete.

In characteristic p>0, the theory DCF_{p} eliminates quantifiers in the language of differential fields with a unary function r added that is the pth root of all constants, and is 0 on elements that are not constant.

== Differential Nullstellensatz ==
The differential Nullstellensatz is the analogue in differential algebra of Hilbert's nullstellensatz.

- A differential ideal or ∂-ideal is an ideal closed under ∂.
- An ideal is called radical if it contains all roots of its elements.

Suppose that K is a differentially closed field of characteristic 0.. Then Seidenberg's differential nullstellensatz states there is a bijection between

- Radical differential ideals in the ring of differential polynomials in n variables, and
- ∂-closed subsets of K^{n}.

This correspondence maps a ∂-closed subset to the ideal of elements vanishing on it, and maps an ideal to its set of zeros.

== Omega stability ==
In characteristic 0 Blum showed that the theory of differentially closed fields is ω-stable and has Morley rank ω. In non-zero characteristic Wood (1973) showed that the theory of differentially closed fields is not ω-stable, and Shelah (1973) showed more precisely that it is stable but not superstable.

== See also ==
- Differential Galois theory
