= Weakly o-minimal structure =

In model theory, a weakly o-minimal structure is a model-theoretic structure whose definable sets in the domain are just finite unions of convex sets.

== Definition ==
A linearly ordered structure, M, with language L including an ordering relation <, is called weakly o-minimal if every parametrically definable subset of M is a finite union of convex (definable) subsets. A theory is weakly o-minimal if all its models are weakly o-minimal.

Note that, in contrast to o-minimality, it is possible for a theory to have models that are weakly o-minimal and to have other models that are not weakly o-minimal.

== Difference from o-minimality ==
In an o-minimal structure $(M,<,...)$ the definable sets in $M$ are finite unions of points and intervals, where interval stands for a sets of the form $I=\{r\in M\,:\,a<r<b\}$, for some a and b in $M \cup \{\pm \infty\}$. For weakly o-minimal structures $(M,<,...)$ this is relaxed so that the definable sets in M are finite unions of convex definable sets. A set $C$ is convex if whenever a and b are in $C$, a < b and c ∈ $M$ satisfies that a < c < b, then c is in C. Points and intervals are of course convex sets, but there are convex sets that are not either points or intervals, as explained below.

If we have a weakly o-minimal structure expanding (R,<), the real ordered field, then the structure will be o-minimal. The two notions are different in other settings though. For example, let R be the ordered field of real algebraic numbers with the usual ordering < inherited from R. Take a transcendental number, say π, and add a unary relation S to the structure given by the subset (−π,π) ∩ R. Now consider the subset A of R defined by the formula

$$0<a \,\wedge\, S(a)$$

so that the set consists of all strictly positive real algebraic numbers that are less than π. The set is clearly convex, but cannot be written as a finite union of points and intervals whose endpoints are in R. To write it as an interval one would either have to include the endpoint π, which isn't in R, or one would require infinitely many intervals, such as the union

$$\bigcup_{\alpha<\pi}(0,\alpha).$$

Since we have a definable set that isn't a finite union of points and intervals, this structure is not o-minimal. However, it is known that the structure is weakly o-minimal, and in fact the theory of this structure is weakly o-minimal.
