= Strongly minimal theory =

Concept from mathematical logic

In model theory—a branch of mathematical logic—a minimal structure is an infinite one-sorted structure such that every subset of its domain that is definable with parameters is either finite or cofinite. A strongly minimal theory is a complete theory all models of which are minimal. A strongly minimal structure is a structure whose theory is strongly minimal.

Thus a structure is minimal only if the parametrically definable subsets of its domain cannot be avoided, because they are already parametrically definable in the pure language of equality. Strong minimality was one of the early notions in the new field of classification theory and stability theory that was opened up by Morley's theorem on totally categorical structures.

The nontrivial standard examples of strongly minimal theories are the one-sorted theories of infinite-dimensional vector spaces, and the theories ACF_{p} of algebraically closed fields of characteristic p. As the example ACF_{p} shows, the parametrically definable subsets of the square of the domain of a minimal structure can be relatively complicated ("curves").

More generally, a subset of a structure that is defined as the set of realizations of a formula φ(x) is called a minimal set if every parametrically definable subset of it is either finite or cofinite. It is called a strongly minimal set if this is true even in all elementary extensions.

A strongly minimal set, equipped with the closure operator given by algebraic closure in the model-theoretic sense, is an infinite matroid, or pregeometry. A model of a strongly minimal theory is determined up to isomorphism by its dimension as a matroid. Totally categorical theories are controlled by a strongly minimal set; this fact explains (and is used in the proof of) Morley's theorem. Boris Zilber conjectured that the only pregeometries that can arise from strongly minimal sets are those that arise in vector spaces, projective spaces, or algebraically closed fields. This conjecture was refuted by Ehud Hrushovski, who developed a method known as "Hrushovski construction" to build new strongly minimal structures from finite structures.

== See also ==
- C-minimal theory
- o-minimal theory
