= Atomic model (mathematical logic) =

In model theory, a subfield of mathematical logic, an atomic model is a model such that the complete type of every tuple is axiomatized by a single formula. Such types are called principal types, and the formulas that axiomatize them are called complete formulas.

== Definitions ==
Let T be a theory. A complete type p(x_{1}, ..., x_{n}) is called principal or atomic (relative to T) if it is axiomatized relative to T by a single formula φ(x_{1}, ..., x_{n}) ∈ p(x_{1}, ..., x_{n}).

A formula φ is called complete in T if for every formula ψ(x_{1}, ..., x_{n}), the theory T ∪ {φ} entails exactly one of ψ and ¬ψ. It follows that a complete type is principal if and only if it contains a complete formula.

A model M is called atomic if every n-tuple of elements of M satisfies a formula that is complete in Th(M)—the theory of M.

== Examples ==
- The ordered field of real algebraic numbers is the unique atomic model of the theory of real closed fields.
- Any finite model is atomic.
- A dense linear ordering without endpoints is atomic.
- Any prime model of a countable theory is atomic by the omitting types theorem.
- Any countable atomic model is prime, but there are plenty of atomic models that are not prime, such as an uncountable dense linear order without endpoints.
- The theory of a countable number of independent unary relations is complete but has no completable formulas and no atomic models.

== Properties ==
The back-and-forth method can be used to show that any two countable atomic models of a theory that are elementarily equivalent are isomorphic.
