= Diagram (disambiguation) =

A diagram is a symbolic representation of information using visualization techniques.

Diagram or Diagrams may also refer to:

- Diagram (category theory), categorical analogue of an indexed family in set theory
- Diagram (mathematical logic), proving useful properties of a theory
- Diagrams (band), British rock band
- Ophite Diagrams, esoteric ritual diagrams used by the Ophite sect of Gnosticism

== See also ==
- The Diagram Brothers
