= U-rank =

In model theory, a branch of mathematical logic, U-rank is one measure of the complexity of a (complete) type, in the context of stable theories. As usual, higher U-rank indicates less restriction, and the existence of a U-rank for all types over all sets is equivalent to an important model-theoretic condition: in this case, superstability.

== Definition ==
U-rank is defined inductively, as follows, for any (complete) n-type p over any set A:

- U(p) ≥ 0
- If δ is a limit ordinal, then U(p) ≥ δ precisely when U(p) ≥ α for all α less than δ
- For any α = β + 1, U(p) ≥ α precisely when there is a forking extension q of p with U(q) ≥ β

We say that U(p) = α when the U(p) ≥ α but not U(p) ≥ α + 1.

If U(p) ≥ α for all ordinals α, we say the U-rank is unbounded, or U(p) = ∞.

Note: U-rank is formally denoted $U_n(p)$, where p is really p(x), and x is a tuple of variables of length n. This subscript is typically omitted when no confusion can result.

== Ranking theories ==
U-rank is monotone in its domain. That is, suppose p is a complete type over A and B is a subset of A. Then for q the restriction of p to B, U(q) ≥ U(p).

If we take B (above) to be empty, then we get the following: if there is an n-type p, over some set of parameters, with rank at least α, then there is a type over the empty set of rank at least α. Thus, we can define, for a complete (stable) theory T, $U_n(T)=\sup \{ U_n(p) : p\in S(T) \}$.

We then get a concise characterization of superstability; a stable theory T is superstable if and only if $U_n(T)<\infty$ for every n.

== Properties ==
- As noted above, U-rank is monotone in its domain.
- If p has U-rank α, then for any β < α, there is a forking extension q of p with U-rank β.
- If p is the type of b over A, there is some set B extending A, with q the type of b over B.
- If p is unranked (that is, p has U-rank ∞), then there is a forking extension q of p which is also unranked.
- Even in the absence of superstability, there is an ordinal β which is the maximum rank of all ranked types, and for any α < β, there is a type p of rank α, and if the rank of p is greater than β, then it must be ∞.

== Examples ==
- U(p) > 0 precisely when p is nonalgebraic.
- If T is the theory of algebraically closed fields (of any fixed characteristic) then $U_1(T)=1$. Further, if A is any set of parameters and K is the field generated by A, then a 1-type p over A has rank 1 if (all realizations of) p are transcendental over K, and 0 otherwise. More generally, an n-type p over A has U-rank k, the transcendence degree (over K) of any realization of it.
