= Algebraic group =

Algebraic variety with a group structure

In mathematics, an algebraic group is an algebraic variety endowed with a group structure that is compatible with its structure as an algebraic variety. Thus the study of algebraic groups belongs both to algebraic geometry and group theory.

Many groups of geometric transformations are algebraic groups, including orthogonal groups, general linear groups, projective groups, Euclidean groups, etc. Many matrix groups are also algebraic. Other algebraic groups occur naturally in algebraic geometry, such as elliptic curves and Jacobian varieties.

An important class of algebraic groups is given by the affine algebraic groups, those whose underlying algebraic variety is an affine variety; they are exactly the algebraic subgroups of the general linear group, and are therefore also called linear algebraic groups. Another class is formed by the abelian varieties, which are the algebraic groups whose underlying variety is a projective variety. Chevalley's structure theorem states that every algebraic group can be constructed from groups in those two families.

== Definitions ==
Formally, an algebraic group over a field $k$ is an algebraic variety $\mathrm G$ over $k$, together with a distinguished element $e \in \mathrm G(k)$ (the neutral element), and regular maps $\mathrm G \times \mathrm G \to \mathrm G$ (the multiplication operation) and $\mathrm G \to \mathrm G$ (the inversion operation) that satisfy the group axioms.

=== Examples ===
- The additive group: the affine line $\mathbb A^1$ endowed with addition and opposite as group operations is an algebraic group. It is called the additive group (because its $k$-points are isomorphic as a group to the additive group of $k$), and usually denoted by $\mathrm G_a$.
- The multiplicative group: Let $\mathrm G_m$ be the affine variety defined by the equation $xy = 1$ in the affine plane $\mathbb A^2$. The functions $((x, y), (x', y')) \mapsto (xx', yy')$ and $(x, y) \mapsto (x^{-1}, y^{-1})$ are regular on $\mathrm G_m$, and they satisfy the group axioms (with neutral element $(1, 1)$). The algebraic group $\mathrm G_m$ is called the multiplicative group, because its $k$-points are isomorphic to the multiplicative group of the field $k$ (an isomorphism is given by $x \mapsto (x, x^{-1})$; note that the subset of invertible elements does not define an algebraic subvariety in $\mathbb A^1$).
- The special linear group $\mathrm{SL}_n$ is an algebraic group: it is given by the algebraic equation $\det(g)=1$ in the affine space $\mathbb A^{n^2}$ (identified with the space of $n$-by-$n$ matrices), multiplication of matrices is regular and the formula for the inverse in terms of the adjugate matrix shows that inversion is regular as well on matrices with determinant 1.
- The general linear group $\mathrm{GL}_n$ of invertible matrices over a field $k$ is an algebraic group. It can be realized as a subvariety in $\mathbb A^{n^2+1}$ in much the same way as the multiplicative group in the previous example.
- A non-singular cubic curve in the projective plane $\mathbb P^2$ with a specified point can be endowed with a geometrically defined group law that makes it into an algebraic group (see elliptic curve).

=== Related definitions ===
An algebraic subgroup of an algebraic group $\mathrm G$ is a subvariety $\mathrm H$ of $\mathrm G$ that is also a subgroup of $\mathrm G$ (that is, the maps $\mathrm G \times \mathrm G \to \mathrm G$ and $\mathrm G \to \mathrm G$ defining the group structure map $\mathrm H \times \mathrm H$ and $\mathrm H$, respectively, into $\mathrm H$).

A morphism between two algebraic groups $\mathrm G, \mathrm G'$ is a regular map $\mathrm G \to \mathrm G'$ that is also a group homomorphism. Its kernel is an algebraic subgroup of $\mathrm G$, and its image is an algebraic subgroup of $\mathrm G'$.

Quotients in the category of algebraic groups are more delicate to deal with. An algebraic subgroup is said to be normal if it is stable under every inner automorphism (which are regular maps). If $\mathrm H$ is a normal algebraic subgroup of $\mathrm G$, then there exists an algebraic group $\mathrm G/\mathrm H$ and a surjective morphism $\pi : \mathrm G \to \mathrm G/\mathrm H$ such that $\mathrm H$ is the kernel of $\pi$. Note that if the field $k$ is not algebraically closed, then the morphism of groups $\mathrm G(k) \to \mathrm G(k)/\mathrm H(k)$ may not be surjective (the defect of surjectivity is measured by Galois cohomology).

=== Lie algebra of an algebraic group ===
Similarly to the Lie group–Lie algebra correspondence, to an algebraic group over a field $k$ is associated a Lie algebra over $k$. In positive characteristic, this is a restricted Lie algebra. As a vector space, the Lie algebra is isomorphic to the tangent space at the identity element. The Lie bracket can be constructed from its interpretation as a space of derivations.

=== Alternative definitions ===
A more sophisticated and more general definition is that of a group scheme (which can more generally be defined over commutative rings). An algebraic group over a field $k$ is then a group scheme over $k$ that is simultaneously a $k$-variety.

Yet another definition of the concept is to say that an algebraic group over $k$ is a group object in the category of algebraic varieties over $k$.

== Affine algebraic groups ==
An algebraic group is said to be affine if its underlying algebraic variety is an affine variety. Among the examples above, the additive, multiplicative, general linear, and special linear groups are affine. Using the action of an affine algebraic group on its coordinate ring, it can be shown that every affine algebraic group is a linear (or matrix) group, meaning that it is isomorphic to an algebraic subgroup of the general linear group.

For example, the additive group can be embedded in $\mathrm{GL}_2$ by the morphism
$$x \mapsto \left(\begin{matrix} 1 & x \\ 0 & 1 \end{matrix}\right)$$.

There are many examples of such groups beyond those given previously, including orthogonal groups, symplectic groups, unipotent groups, algebraic tori, and certain semidirect products, such as jet groups, or some solvable groups such as that of invertible triangular matrices.

Linear algebraic groups can be classified to a certain extent. Levi's theorem states that every linear algebraic group is (essentially) a semidirect product of a unipotent group (its unipotent radical) with a reductive group. In turn, a reductive group is decomposed as (again essentially) a product of its center (an algebraic torus) with a semisimple group. The latter are classified over algebraically closed fields via their Lie algebras. The classification over arbitrary fields is more involved, but still well-understood. If can be made very explicit in some cases, such as over the real or p-adic fields, and thereby over number fields via local-global principles.

== Abelian varieties ==
Abelian varieties are connected projective algebraic groups, such as elliptic curves. They are always commutative. They arise naturally in various situations in algebraic geometry and number theory, such as the Jacobian varieties of curves.

== Structure theorem for general algebraic groups ==
Not all algebraic groups are linear groups or abelian varieties; for instance, some group schemes occurring naturally in arithmetic geometry are neither. Chevalley's structure theorem asserts that every connected algebraic group is an extension of an abelian variety by a linear algebraic group. More precisely, if K is a perfect field, and G a connected algebraic group over K, then there exists a unique normal closed subgroup H in G, such that H is a connected linear algebraic group and G/H an abelian variety.

== Connectedness ==
As an algebraic variety, $\mathrm G$ carries a Zariski topology. It is not in general a group topology; that is, the group operations may not be continuous for this topology (because the Zariski topology on the product is not the product of Zariski topologies on the factors).

An algebraic group is said to be connected if the underlying algebraic variety is connected for the Zariski topology. For an algebraic group, this means that it is not the union of two proper algebraic subsets.

Examples of groups that are not connected are given by the algebraic subgroup of $n$th roots of unity in the multiplicative group $\mathrm G_m$ (each point is a Zariski-closed subset so it is not connected for $n \ge 1$). This group is generally denoted by $\mu_n$. Other non-connected groups are the orthogonal group in even dimension (the determinant gives a surjective morphism to $\mu_2$).

More generally, every finite group is an algebraic group (it can be realised as a finite, hence Zariski-closed, subgroup of some $\mathrm{GL}_n$ by Cayley's theorem). In addition it is both affine and projective. Thus, in particular for classification purposes, it is natural to restrict statements to connected algebraic groups.

== Algebraic groups over local fields and Lie groups ==
If the field $k$ is a local field (for instance the real or complex numbers, or a p-adic field) and $\mathrm G$ is a $k$-group, then the group $\mathrm G(k)$ is endowed with the analytic topology coming from any embedding into a projective space $\mathbb P^n(k)$ as a quasi-projective variety. This is a group topology, and it makes $\mathrm G(k)$ into a topological group. Such groups are important examples in the general theory of topological groups.

If $k = \mathbb R$ or $\mathbb C$, then this makes $\mathrm G(k)$ into a Lie group. Not all Lie groups can be obtained via this procedure; for example, the universal cover of SL_{2}(R), or the quotient of the Heisenberg group by an infinite normal discrete subgroup. An algebraic group over the real or complex numbers may have closed subgroups (in the analytic topology) that do not have the same connected component of the identity as any algebraic subgroup.

== Coxeter groups and algebraic groups ==
There are a number of analogous results between algebraic groups and Coxeter groups – for instance, the number of elements of the symmetric group is $n!$, and the number of elements of the general linear group over a finite field is (up to some factor) the q-factorial $[n]_q!$; thus, the symmetric group behaves as though it were a linear group over "the field with one element". This is formalized by the field with one element, which considers Coxeter groups to be simple algebraic groups over the field with one element.

== See also ==
- Character variety
- Borel subgroup
- Tame group
- Morley rank
- Cherlin–Zilber conjecture
- Adelic algebraic group
- Pseudo-reductive group
