= Tame group =

In mathematical group theory, a tame group is a certain kind of group defined in model theory.

Formally, we define a bad field as a structure of the form (K, T), where K is an algebraically closed field and T is an infinite, proper, distinguished subgroup of K, such that (K, T) is of finite Morley rank in its full language. A group G is then called a tame group if no bad field is interpretable in G.
