= Joint embedding property =

In universal algebra and model theory, a class of structures K is said to have the joint embedding property if for all structures A and B in K, there is a structure C in K such that both A and B have embeddings into C.

It is one of the three properties used to define the age of a structure.

A first-order theory has the joint embedding property if the class of its models of has the joint embedding property. A complete theory has the joint embedding property. Conversely a model-complete theory with the joint embedding property is complete.

A similar but different notion to the joint embedding property is the amalgamation property. To see the difference, first consider the class K (or simply the set) containing three models with linear orders, L_{1} of size one, L_{2} of size two, and L_{3} of size three. This class K has the joint embedding property because all three models can be embedded into L_{3}. However, K does not have the amalgamation property. The counterexample for this starts with L_{1} containing a single element e and extends in two different ways to L_{3}, one in which e is the smallest and the other in which e is the largest. Now any common model with an embedding from these two extensions must be at least of size five so that there are two elements on either side of e.

Now consider the class of algebraically closed fields. This class has the amalgamation property since any two field extensions of a prime field can be embedded into a common field. However, two arbitrary fields cannot be embedded into a common field when the characteristic of the fields differ.
