= Generalized Jacobian =

In algebraic geometry a generalized Jacobian is a commutative algebraic group associated to a curve with a divisor, generalizing the Jacobian variety of a complete curve. They were introduced by Maxwell Rosenlicht in 1954, and can be used to study ramified coverings of a curve, with abelian Galois group. Generalized Jacobians of a curve are extensions of the Jacobian of the curve by a commutative affine algebraic group, giving nontrivial examples of Chevalley's structure theorem.

== Definition ==
Suppose C is a complete nonsingular curve, m an effective divisor on C, S is the support of m, and P is a fixed base point on C not in S. The generalized Jacobian J_{m} is a commutative algebraic group with a rational map f from C to J_{m} such that:

- f takes P to the identity of J_{m}.
- f is regular outside S.
- f(D) = 0 whenever D is the divisor of a rational function g on C such that g≡1 mod m.

Moreover J_{m} is the universal group with these properties, in the sense that any rational map from C to a group with the properties above factors uniquely through J_{m}. The group J_{m} does not depend on the choice of base point P, though changing P changes that map f by a translation.

== Structure of the generalized Jacobian ==
For m = 0 the generalized Jacobian J_{m} is just the usual Jacobian J, an abelian variety of dimension g, the genus of C.

For m a nonzero effective divisor the generalized Jacobian is an extension of J by a connected commutative affine algebraic group L_{m} of dimension deg(m)−1. So we have an exact sequence

0 → L_{m} → J_{m} → J → 0

The group L_{m} is a quotient

0 → G_{m} → ΠU_{P_{i}}^{(n_{i})} → L_{m} → 0

of a product of groups R_{i} by the multiplicative group G_{m} of the underlying field. The product runs over the points P_{i} in the support of m, and the group U_{P_{i}}^{(n_{i})} is the group of invertible elements of the local ring modulo those that are 1 mod P_{i}^{n_{i}}. The group U_{P_{i}}^{(n_{i})} has dimension n_{i}, the number of times P_{i} occurs in m. It is the product of the multiplicative group G_{m} by a unipotent group of dimension n_{i}−1, which in characteristic 0 is isomorphic to a product of n_{i}−1 additive groups.

== Complex generalized Jacobians ==
Over the complex numbers, the algebraic structure of the generalized Jacobian determines an analytic structure of the generalized Jacobian making it a complex Lie group.

The analytic subgroup underlying the generalized Jacobian can be described as follows. (This does not always determine the algebraic structure as two non-isomorphic commutative algebraic groups may be isomorphic as analytic groups.) Suppose that C is a curve with an effective divisor m with support S. There is a natural map from the homology group H_{1}(C − S) to the dual Ω(−m)* of the complex vector space Ω(−m) (1-forms with poles on m) induced by the integral of a 1-form over a 1-cycle. The analytic generalized Jacobian is then the quotient group Ω(−m)*/H_{1}(C − S).
