= NIP (model theory) =

In model theory, a branch of mathematical logic, a complete theory T is said to satisfy NIP ("not the independence property") if none of its formulae satisfy the independence property—that is, if none of its formulae can pick out any given subset of an arbitrarily large finite set.

== Definition ==
Let T be a complete L-theory. An L-formula φ(x,y) is said to have the independence property (with respect to x, y) if in every model M of T there is, for each n = {0,1,...,n − 1} < ω, a family of tuples b_{0},...,b_{n−1} such that for each of the 2^{n} subsets X of n there is a tuple a in M for which

$$M\models\varphi(\boldsymbol{a},\boldsymbol{b}_i)\quad\Leftrightarrow\quad  i\in X.$$

The theory T is said to have the independence property if some formula has the independence property. If no L-formula has the independence property then T is called dependent, or said to satisfy NIP. An L-structure is said to have the independence property (respectively, NIP) if its theory has the independence property (respectively, NIP). The terminology comes from the notion of independence in the sense of boolean algebras.

In the nomenclature of Vapnik–Chervonenkis theory, we may say that a collection S of subsets of X shatters a set B ⊆ X if every subset of B is of the form B ∩ S for some S ∈ S. Then T has the independence property if in some model M of T there is a definable family (S_{a} | a∈M^{n}) ⊆ M^{k} that shatters arbitrarily large finite subsets of M^{k}. In other words, (S_{a} | a∈M^{n}) has infinite Vapnik–Chervonenkis dimension.

== Examples ==
Any complete theory T that has the independence property is unstable.

In arithmetic, i.e. the structure (N,+,·), the formula "y divides x" has the independence property. This formula is just

$$(\exists k)(y\cdot k=x).$$

So, for any finite n we take the n 1-tuples b_{i} to be the first n prime numbers, and then for any subset X of {0,1,...,n − 1} we let a be the product of those b_{i} such that i is in X. Then b_{i} divides a if and only if i ∈ X.

Every o-minimal theory satisfies NIP. This fact has had unexpected applications to neural network learning.

Examples of NIP theories include also the theories of all the following structures: linear orders, trees, abelian linearly ordered groups, algebraically closed valued fields, and the p-adic field for any p.
