= Stable group =

Concept in model theory

In model theory, a stable group is a group that is stable in the sense of stability theory. An important class of examples is provided by groups of finite Morley rank (see below).

== Examples ==
- A group of finite Morley rank is an abstract group G such that the formula x = x has finite Morley rank for the model G. It follows from the definition that the theory of a group of finite Morley rank is ω-stable; therefore groups of finite Morley rank are stable groups. Groups of finite Morley rank behave in certain ways like finite-dimensional objects. The striking similarities between groups of finite Morley rank and finite groups are an object of active research.
- All finite groups have finite Morley rank, in fact rank 0.
- Algebraic groups over algebraically closed fields have finite Morley rank, equal to their dimension as algebraic sets.
- Sela (2006) showed that free groups, and more generally torsion-free hyperbolic groups, are stable. Free groups on more than one generator are not superstable.

== The Cherlin–Zilber conjecture ==
The Cherlin–Zilber conjecture (also called the algebraicity conjecture), due to Gregory Cherlin (1979) and Boris Zil'ber (1977), suggests that infinite (ω-stable) simple groups are simple algebraic groups over algebraically closed fields. The conjecture would have followed from Zilber's trichotomy conjecture. Cherlin posed the question for all ω-stable simple groups, but remarked that even the case of groups of finite Morley rank seemed hard.

Progress towards this conjecture has followed Borovik’s program of transferring methods used in classification of finite simple groups. One possible source of counterexamples is bad groups: nonsoluble connected groups of finite Morley rank all of whose proper connected definable subgroups are nilpotent. (A group is called connected if it has no definable subgroups of finite index other than itself.)

A number of special cases of this conjecture have been proved; for example:

- Any connected group of Morley rank 1 is abelian.
- Cherlin proved that a connected rank 2 group is solvable.
- Cherlin proved that a simple group of Morley rank 3 is either a bad group or isomorphic to PSL_{2}(K) for some algebraically closed field K that G interprets.
- Tuna Altinel, Alexandre V. Borovik, and Gregory Cherlin (2008) showed that an infinite group of finite Morley rank is either an algebraic group over an algebraically closed field of characteristic 2, or has finite 2-rank.
