= Hrushovski construction =

In model theory, a branch of mathematical logic, the Hrushovski construction generalizes the Fraïssé limit by working with a notion of strong substructure $\leq$ rather than $\subseteq$. It can be thought of as a kind of "model-theoretic forcing", where a (usually) stable structure is created, called the generic or rich model. The specifics of $\leq$ determine various properties of the generic, with its geometric properties being of particular interest. It was initially used by Ehud Hrushovski to generate a stable structure with an "exotic" geometry, thereby refuting Zil'ber's Conjecture.

== Three conjectures ==
The initial applications of the Hrushovski construction refuted two conjectures and answered a third question in the negative. Specifically, we have:

- Lachlan's Conjecture. Any stable $\aleph_0$-categorical theory is totally transcendental.
- Zil'ber's Conjecture. Any uncountably categorical theory is either locally modular or interprets an algebraically closed field.
- Cherlin's Question. Is there a maximal (with respect to expansions) strongly minimal set?

== The construction ==
Let L be a finite relational language. Fix C a class of finite L-structures which are closed under isomorphisms and substructures. We want to strengthen the notion of substructure; let $\leq$ be a relation on pairs from C satisfying:

- $A \leq B$ implies $A \subseteq B.$
- $A \subseteq B \subseteq C$ and $A \leq C$ implies $A \leq B$
- $\varnothing \leq A$ for all $A \in \mathbf{C}.$
- $A \leq B$ implies $A \cap C \leq B \cap C$ for all $C \in \mathbf{C}.$
- If $f\colon A \to A'$ is an isomorphism and $A \leq B$, then $f$ extends to an isomorphism $B \to B'$ for some superset of $A'$ with $A' \leq B'.$

Definition. An embedding $f: A \hookrightarrow D$ is strong if $f(A) \leq D.$

Definition. The pair $(\mathbf{C}, \leq)$ has the amalgamation property if $A \leq B_1, B_2$ then there is a $D \in \mathbf{C}$ so that each $B_i$ embeds strongly into $D$ with the same image for $A.$

Definition. For infinite $D$ and $A \in \mathbf{C},$ we say $A \leq D$ iff $A \leq X$ for $A \subseteq X \subseteq D, X \in \mathbf{C}.$

Definition. For any $A \subseteq D,$ the closure of $A$ in $D,$ denoted by $\operatorname{cl}_D(A),$ is the smallest superset of $A$ satisfying $\operatorname{cl}(A) \leq D.$

Definition. A countable structure $G$ is $(\mathbf{C}, \leq)$-generic if:

- For $A \subseteq_\omega G, A \in \mathbf{C}.$
- For $A \leq G,$ if $A \leq B$ then there is a strong embedding of $B$ into $G$ over $A.$
- $G$ has finite closures: for every $A \subseteq_\omega G, \operatorname{cl}_G(A)$ is finite.

Theorem. If $(\mathbf{C},\leq)$ has the amalgamation property, then there is a unique $(\mathbf{C},\leq)$-generic.

The existence proof proceeds in imitation of the existence proof for Fraïssé limits. The uniqueness proof comes from an easy back and forth argument.
