= Saturated model =

Model for mathematical theories

In mathematical logic, and particularly in its subfield model theory, a saturated model is one that realizes as many complete types as may be "reasonably expected" given its size. For example, an ultrapower model of the hyperreals is $\aleph_1$-saturated, meaning that every descending nested sequence of internal sets has a nonempty intersection.

== Definition ==
Let κ be a finite or infinite cardinal number and M a model in some first-order language. Then M is called κ-saturated if for all subsets A ⊆ M of cardinality strictly less than κ, the model M realizes all complete types over A. The model M is called saturated if it is |M|-saturated where |M| denotes the cardinality of M. That is, it realizes all complete types over sets of parameters of size less than |M|. According to some authors, a model M is called countably saturated if it is $\aleph_1$-saturated; that is, it realizes all complete types over countable sets of parameters. According to others, it is countably saturated if it is countable and saturated.

== Motivation ==
The seemingly more intuitive notion—that all complete types of the language are realized—turns out to be too weak (and is appropriately named weak saturation, which is the same as 1-saturation). The difference lies in the fact that many structures contain elements that are not definable (for example, any transcendental element of R is, by definition of the word, not definable in the language of fields). However, they still form a part of the structure, so we need types to describe relationships with them. Thus we allow sets of parameters from the structure in our definition of types. This argument allows us to discuss specific features of the model that we may otherwise miss—for example, a bound on a specific increasing sequence c_{n} can be expressed as realizing the type {x ≥ c_{n} : n ∈ ω}, which uses countably many parameters. If the sequence is not definable, this fact about the structure cannot be described using the base language, so a weakly saturated structure may not bound the sequence, while an ℵ_{1}-saturated structure will.

The reason we only require parameter sets that are strictly smaller than the model is trivial: without this restriction, no infinite model is saturated. Consider a model M, and the type {x ≠ m : m ∈ M}. Each finite subset of this type is realized in the (infinite) model M, so by compactness, the type is consistent with M, but is trivially not realized. Any definition that is universally unsatisfied is useless; hence the restriction.

== Examples ==
Saturated models exist for certain theories and cardinalities:

- (Q, <)—the set of rational numbers with their usual ordering—is saturated. Intuitively, this is because any type consistent with the theory is implied by the order type; that is, the order the variables come in tells you everything there is to know about their role in the structure.
- (R, <)—the set of real numbers with their usual ordering—is not saturated. For example, take the type (in one variable x) that contains the formula $\textstyle{x> -\frac{1}{n}}$ for every natural number n, as well as the formula $\textstyle{x<0}$. This type uses ω different parameters from R. Every finite subset of the type is realized on R by some real x, so by compactness the type is consistent with the structure, but it is not realized, as that would imply an upper bound to the sequence −1/n that is less than 0 (its least upper bound). Thus (R,<) is not ω_{1}-saturated, and not saturated. However, it is ω-saturated, for essentially the same reason as Q—every finite type is given by the order type, which if consistent, is always realized, because of the density of the order.
- A dense totally ordered set without endpoints is a η_{α} set if and only if it is ℵ_{α}-saturated.
- The countable random graph, with the only non-logical symbol being the edge existence relation, is also saturated, because any complete type is isolated (implied) by the formula describing the finite subgraph induced by the variables and parameters used to define the type.

Both the theory of (Q, <) and the theory of the countable random graph can be shown to be ω-categorical through the back-and-forth method. This can be generalized as follows: the unique model of cardinality κ of a countable κ-categorical theory is saturated.

However, the statement that every model has a saturated elementary extension is not provable in ZFC. In fact, this statement is equivalent to the existence of a proper class of cardinals κ such that κ^{<κ} = κ. The latter identity is equivalent to κ = λ^{+} = 2^{λ} for some λ, or κ is strongly inaccessible.

== Relationship to prime models ==
The notion of saturated model is dual to the notion of prime model in the following way: let T be a countable theory in a first-order language (that is, a set of mutually consistent sentences in that language) and let P be a prime model of T. Then P admits an elementary embedding into any other model of T. The equivalent notion for saturated models is that any "reasonably small" model of T is elementarily embedded in a saturated model, where "reasonably small" means cardinality no larger than that of the model in which it is to be embedded. Any saturated model is also homogeneous. However, while for countable theories there is a unique prime model, saturated models are necessarily specific to a particular cardinality. Given certain set-theoretic assumptions, saturated models (albeit of very large cardinality) exist for arbitrary theories. For λ-stable theories, saturated models of cardinality λ exist.
