= Classification theory =

Classification theory may refer to:

- For the task of allocating things to classes or categories reliably, see Classification
- For the task of devising classes or categories (and potentially then allocating things to them), see Taxonomy and Library science
- For the science of finding, describing and categorising organisms see alpha taxonomy
- For classification theory in biology see Biological classification
- For classification theory in mathematical model theory see stable theory
