= C-minimal theory =

In model theory, a branch of mathematical logic, a C-minimal theory is a theory that is "minimal" with respect to a ternary relation C with certain properties. Algebraically closed fields with a (Krull) valuation are perhaps the most important example.

This notion was defined in analogy to the o-minimal theories, which are "minimal" (in the same sense) with respect to a linear order.

== Definition ==
A C-relation is a ternary relation C(x; y, z) that satisfies the following axioms.

1. $\forall xyz\, [ C(x;y,z)\rightarrow C(x;z,y) ],$
2. $\forall xyz\, [ C(x;y,z)\rightarrow\neg C(y;x,z) ],$
3. $\forall xyzw\, [ C(x;y,z)\rightarrow (C(w;y,z)\vee C(x;w,z)) ],$
4. $\forall xy\, [ x\neq y \rightarrow \exists z\neq y\, C(x;y,z) ].$

A C-minimal structure is a structure M, in a signature containing the symbol C, such that C satisfies the above axioms and every set of elements of M that is definable with parameters in M is a Boolean combination of instances of C, i.e. of formulas of the form C(x; b, c), where b and c are elements of M.

A theory is called C-minimal if all of its models are C-minimal. A structure is called strongly C-minimal if its theory is C-minimal. One can construct C-minimal structures which are not strongly C-minimal.

== Example ==
For a prime number p and a p-adic number a, let |a|_{p} denote its p-adic absolute value. Then the relation defined by $C(a; b, c) \iff |b-c|_p < |a-c|_p$ is a C-relation, and the theory of Q_{p} with addition and this relation is C-minimal. The theory of Q_{p} as a field, however, is not C-minimal.
