= Hall's universal group =

In algebra, Hall's universal group is a countable locally finite group, say U, which is uniquely characterized by the following properties.

- Every finite group G admits a monomorphism to U.
- All such monomorphisms are conjugate by inner automorphisms of U.

It was defined by Philip Hall in 1959, and has the universal property that all countable locally finite groups embed into it.

Hall's universal group is the Fraïssé limit of the class of all finite groups.

== Construction ==
Take any group $\Gamma_0$ of order $\geq 3$. Denote by $\Gamma_1$ the group $S_{\Gamma_0}$ of permutations of elements of $\Gamma_0$, by $\Gamma_2$ the group

$$S_{\Gamma_1}= S_{S_{\Gamma_0}} \,$$

and so on. Since a group acts faithfully on itself by permutations

$$x\mapsto gx \,$$

according to Cayley's theorem, this gives a chain of monomorphisms

$$\Gamma_0 \hookrightarrow  \Gamma_1 \hookrightarrow \Gamma_2 \hookrightarrow \cdots . \,$$

A direct limit (that is, a union) of all $\Gamma_i$ is Hall's universal group U.

Indeed, U then contains a symmetric group of arbitrarily large order, and any group admits a monomorphism to a group of permutations, as explained above. Let G be a finite group admitting two embeddings to U. Since U is a direct limit and G is finite, the images of these two embeddings belong to $\Gamma_i \subset U$. The group $\Gamma_{i+1}= S_{\Gamma_i}$ acts on $\Gamma_i$ by permutations, and conjugates all possible embeddings $G \hookrightarrow \Gamma_i$.
