= Model complete theory =

Concept in model theory

In model theory, a first-order theory is called model complete if every embedding of its models is an elementary embedding. Equivalently, every first-order formula is equivalent to a universal formula. This notion was introduced by Abraham Robinson.

== Model companion and model completion ==
A companion of a theory T is a theory T* such that every model of T can be embedded in a model of T* and vice versa.

A model companion of a theory T is a companion of T that is model complete. Robinson proved that a theory has at most one model companion. Not every theory is model-companionable, e.g. theory of groups. However if T is an $\aleph_0$-categorical theory, then it always has a model companion.

A model completion for a theory T is a model companion T* such that for any model M of T, the theory of T* together with the diagram of M is complete. Roughly speaking, this means every model of T is embeddable in a model of T* in a unique way.

If T* is a model companion of T then the following conditions are equivalent:

- T* is a model completion of T
- T has the amalgamation property.

If T also has universal axiomatization, both of the above are also equivalent to:

- T* has elimination of quantifiers

== Examples ==
- Any theory with elimination of quantifiers is model complete.
- The theory of algebraically closed fields is the model completion of the theory of fields. It is model complete but not complete.
- The model completion of the theory of equivalence relations is the theory of equivalence relations with infinitely many equivalence classes, each containing an infinite number of elements.
- The theory of real closed fields, in the language of ordered rings, is a model completion of the theory of ordered fields (or even ordered domains).
- The theory of real closed fields, in the language of rings, is the model companion for the theory of formally real fields, but is not a model completion.

== Non-examples ==
- The theory of dense linear orders with a first and last element is complete but not model complete.
- The theory of groups (in a language with symbols for the identity, product, and inverses) has the amalgamation property but does not have a model companion.

== Sufficient condition for completeness of model-complete theories ==
If T is a model complete theory and there is a model of T that embeds into any model of T, then T is complete.
