= Chevalley's structure theorem =

Theorem in algebraic geometry

In algebraic geometry, Chevalley's structure theorem states that a smooth connected algebraic group over a perfect field has a unique normal smooth connected affine algebraic subgroup such that the quotient is an abelian variety. It was proved by Chevalley (1960) (though he had previously announced the result in 1953), Barsotti (1955a, 1955b), and Rosenlicht (1956).

Chevalley's original proof, and the other early proofs by Barsotti and Rosenlicht, used the idea of mapping the algebraic group to its Albanese variety. The original proofs were based on Weil's book Foundations of algebraic geometry and are hard to follow for anyone unfamiliar with Weil's foundations, but Conrad (2002) later gave an exposition of Chevalley's proof in scheme-theoretic terminology.

Over non-perfect fields there is still a smallest normal connected linear subgroup such that the quotient is an abelian variety, but the linear subgroup need not be smooth.

A consequence of Chevalley's theorem is that any algebraic group over a field is quasi-projective.

== Examples ==
There are several natural constructions that give connected algebraic groups that are neither affine nor complete.

- If C is a curve with an effective divisor m, then it has an associated generalized Jacobian J_{m}. This is a commutative algebraic group that maps onto the Jacobian variety J_{0} of C with affine kernel. So J is an extension of an abelian variety by an affine algebraic group. In general this extension does not split.
- The reduced connected component of the relative Picard scheme of a proper scheme over a perfect field is an algebraic group, which is in general neither affine nor proper.
- The connected component of the closed fiber of a Neron model over a discrete valuation ring is an algebraic group, which is in general neither affine nor proper.
- For analytic groups some of the obvious analogs of Chevalley's theorem fail. For example, the product of the additive group C and any elliptic curve has a dense collection of closed (analytic but not algebraic) subgroups isomorphic to C so there is no unique "maximal affine subgroup", while the product of two copies of the multiplicative group C* is isomorphic (analytically but not algebraically) to a non-split extension of any given elliptic curve by C.

== Applications ==
Chevalley's structure theorem is used in the proof of the Néron–Ogg–Shafarevich criterion.
