= Locally finite group =

Type of group

In mathematics, in the field of group theory, a locally finite group is a type of group that can be studied in ways analogous to a finite group. Sylow subgroups, Carter subgroups, and abelian subgroups of locally finite groups have been studied. The concept is credited to work in the 1930s by Russian mathematician Sergei Chernikov.

== Definition and first consequences ==
A locally finite group is a group for which every finitely generated subgroup is finite.

Since the cyclic subgroups of a locally finite group are finitely generated hence finite, every element has finite order, and so the group is periodic.

== Examples and non-examples ==
Examples:

- Every finite group is locally finite
- The additive group of rational numbers modulo 1 is locally finite
- Every infinite direct sum of locally finite groups is locally finite (Robinson 1996, p. 443) (Although the direct product may not be.) This shows that there is a locally finite group of any infinite cardinality
- The Prüfer groups are locally finite abelian groups
- Every Hamiltonian group is locally finite
- Every periodic solvable group is locally finite (Dixon 1994, Prop. 1.1.5).
- Every subgroup of a locally finite group is locally finite. (Proof. Let G be a locally finite group and S a subgroup. Every finitely generated subgroup of S is a (finitely generated) subgroup of G.)
- Hall's universal group is a countable locally finite group containing each countable locally finite group as subgroup.
- Every group has a unique maximal normal locally finite subgroup (Robinson 1996, p. 436)
- Every periodic subgroup of the general linear group over the complex numbers is locally finite. Since all locally finite groups are periodic, this means that for linear groups and periodic groups the conditions are identical.
- Omega-categorical groups (that is, groups whose first-order theory characterises them up to isomorphism) are locally finite

Non-examples:

- No group with an element of infinite order is a locally finite group
- No nontrivial free group is locally finite
- A Tarski monster group is periodic, but not locally finite.

== Properties ==
The class of locally finite groups is closed under subgroups, quotients, and extensions (Robinson 1996, p. 429).

Locally finite groups satisfy a weaker form of Sylow's theorems. If a locally finite group has a finite p-subgroup contained in no other p-subgroups, then all maximal p-subgroups are finite and conjugate. If there are finitely many conjugates, then the number of conjugates is congruent to 1 modulo p. In fact, if every countable subgroup of a locally finite group has only countably many maximal p-subgroups, then every maximal p-subgroup of the group is conjugate (Robinson 1996, p. 429).

The class of locally finite groups behaves somewhat similarly to the class of finite groups. Much of the 1960s theory of formations and Fitting classes, as well as the older 19th century and 1930s theory of Sylow subgroups has an analogue in the theory of locally finite groups (Dixon 1994, p. v.).

Similarly to the Burnside problem, mathematicians have wondered whether every infinite group contains an infinite abelian subgroup. While this need not be true in general, a result of Philip Hall and others is that every infinite locally finite group contains an infinite abelian group. The proof of this fact in infinite group theory relies upon the Feit–Thompson theorem on the solubility of finite groups of odd order (Robinson 1996, p. 432).
