= Morley rank =

Mathematical measure of set complexity

In mathematical logic, Morley rank, introduced by Michael D. Morley (1965), is a means of measuring the size of a subset of a model of a theory, generalizing the notion of dimension in algebraic geometry.

== Definition ==
Fix a theory T with a model M. The Morley rank of a formula φ defining a definable (with parameters) subset S of M is an ordinal or −1 or ∞, defined by first recursively defining what it means for a formula to have Morley rank at least α for some ordinal α.

- The Morley rank is at least 0 if S is non-empty.
- For α a successor ordinal, the Morley rank is at least α if in some elementary extension N of M, the set S has countably infinitely many disjoint definable subsets S_{i}, each of rank at least α − 1.
- For α a non-zero limit ordinal, the Morley rank is at least α if it is at least β for all β less than α.

The Morley rank is then defined to be α if it is at least α but not at least α + 1, and is defined to be ∞ if it is at least α for all ordinals α, and is defined to be −1 if S is empty.

For a definable subset of a model M (defined by a formula φ) the Morley rank is defined to be the Morley rank of φ in any ℵ_{0}-saturated elementary extension of M. In particular for ℵ_{0}-saturated models the Morley rank of a subset is the Morley rank of any formula defining the subset.

If φ defining S has rank α, and S breaks up into no more than n < ω subsets of rank α, then φ is said to have Morley degree n. A formula defining a finite set has Morley rank 0. A formula with Morley rank 1 and Morley degree 1 is called strongly minimal. A strongly minimal structure is one where the trivial formula x = x is strongly minimal. Morley rank and strongly minimal structures are key tools in the proof of Morley's categoricity theorem and in the larger area of model theoretic stability theory.

== Examples ==
- The empty set has Morley rank −1, and conversely anything of Morley rank −1 is empty.
- A subset has Morley rank 0 if and only if it is finite and non-empty.
- If V is an algebraic set in K^{n}, for an algebraically closed field K, then the Morley rank of V is the same as its usual Krull dimension. The Morley degree of V is the number of irreducible components of maximal dimension; this is not the same as its degree in algebraic geometry, except when its components of maximal dimension are linear spaces.
- The rational numbers, considered as an ordered set, has Morley rank ∞, as it contains a countable disjoint union of definable subsets isomorphic to itself.

== See also ==
- Cherlin–Zilber conjecture
- Group of finite Morley rank
- U-rank
