= Prime model =

As simple a model as possible, in model theory

In mathematics, and in particular model theory, a prime model is a model that is as simple as possible. Specifically, a model $P$ is prime if it admits an elementary embedding into any model $M$ to which it is elementarily equivalent (that is, into any model $M$ satisfying the same complete theory as $P$).

== Cardinality ==
In contrast with the notion of saturated model, prime models are restricted to very specific cardinalities by the Löwenheim–Skolem theorem. If $L$ is a first-order language with cardinality $\kappa$ and $T$ is a complete theory over $L,$ then this theorem guarantees a model for $T$ of cardinality $\max(\kappa,\aleph_0).$ Therefore, no prime model of $T$ can have larger cardinality since at the very least it must be elementarily embedded in such a model. This still leaves much ambiguity in the actual cardinality. In the case of countable languages, all prime models are at most countably infinite.

== Relationship with saturated models ==
There is a duality between the definitions of prime and saturated models. Half of this duality is discussed in the article on saturated models, while the other half is as follows. While a saturated model realizes as many types as possible, a prime model realizes as few as possible: it is an atomic model, realizing only the types that cannot be omitted and omitting the remainder. This may be interpreted in the sense that a prime model admits "no frills": any characteristic of a model that is optional is ignored in it.

For example, the model $\langle {\mathbb N}, S\rangle$ is a prime model of the theory of the natural numbers N with a successor operation S; a non-prime model might be $\langle {\mathbb N} + {\mathbb Z}, S\rangle ,$ meaning that there is a copy of the full integers that lies disjoint from the original copy of the natural numbers within this model; in this add-on, arithmetic works as usual. These models are elementarily equivalent; their theory admits the following axiomatization (verbally):

1. There is a unique element that is not the successor of any element;
2. No two distinct elements have the same successor;
3. No element satisfies S^{n}(x) = x with n > 0.

These are, in fact, two of Peano's axioms, while the third follows from the first by induction (another of Peano's axioms). Any model of this theory consists of disjoint copies of the full integers in addition to the natural numbers, since once one generates a submodel from 0 all remaining points admit both predecessors and successors indefinitely. This is the outline of a proof that $\langle {\mathbb N}, S\rangle$ is a prime model.
