= O-minimal theory =

Type of infinite structure

In mathematical logic, and more specifically in model theory, an infinite structure $(M,<,\dots)$ that is totally ordered by $<$ is called an o-minimal structure if and only if every definable subset $X\subseteq M$ (with parameters taken from $M$) is a finite union of intervals and points.

O-minimality can be regarded as a weak form of quantifier elimination. A structure $M$ is o-minimal if and only if every formula with one free variable and parameters in $M$ is equivalent to a quantifier-free formula involving only the ordering, also with parameters in $M$. This is analogous to the minimal structures, which are exactly the analogous property down to equality.

A theory $T$ is an o-minimal theory if every model of $T$ is o-minimal. It is known that the complete theory $T$ of an o-minimal structure is an o-minimal theory. This result is remarkable because, in contrast, the complete theory of a minimal structure need not be a strongly minimal theory, that is, there may be an elementarily equivalent structure that is not minimal.

== Set-theoretic definition ==
O-minimal structures can be defined without recourse to model theory. Here we define a structure on a nonempty set $M$ in a set-theoretic manner, as a sequence $(S_n)_{n=0}^\infty$ such that

1. $S_n$ is a boolean algebra of subsets of $M^n$
2. if $D\in S_n$ then $M\times D$ and $D\times M$ are in $S_{n+1}$
3. the set $\{(x_1,\dots,x_n)\in M^n : x_1=x_n\}$ is in $S_n$
4. if $D\in S_{n+1}$ and $\pi:M^{n+1}\to M^n$ is the projection map on the first $n$ coordinates, then $\pi(D)\in S_n$.

For a subset $A$ of $M$, we consider the smallest structure $S(A)$ containing $S$ such that every finite subset of $A$ is contained in $S_1$. A subset $D$ of $M^n$ is called $A$-definable if it is contained in $S_n(A)$; in that case, $A$ is called a set of parameters for $D$. A subset is called definable if it is $A$-definable for some $A$.

If $M$ has a dense linear order without endpoints on it, say $<$, then a structure $S$ on $M$ is called o-minimal (with respect to $<$) if it satisfies the extra axioms

6. the set $<$ (identified with its graph $\{(x, y) \in M^2: x < y\}$) is in $S_2$
7. the definable subsets of $M$ are precisely the finite unions of intervals and points.

The "o" stands for "order", since any o-minimal structure requires an ordering on the underlying set.

== Model theoretic definition ==
O-minimal structures originated in model theory and so have a simpler—but equivalent—definition using the language of model theory. Namely, if $L$ is a language including a binary relation $<$, and $(M,<,\dots)$ is an $L$-structure where $<$ is interpreted to satisfy the axioms of a dense linear order, then $(M,<,\dots)$ is called an o-minimal structure if for any definable set $X\subseteq M$ there are finitely many open intervals $I_1,\dots,I_r$ in $M\cup \{\pm\infty\}$ and a finite set $X_0$ such that

$$X=X_0\cup I_1\cup\ldots\cup I_r.$$

== Examples ==
Examples of o-minimal theories are:

- The complete theory of dense linear orders in the language with just the ordering.
- RCF, the theory of real closed fields.
- The complete theory of the real field with restricted analytic functions added (i.e., analytic functions on a neighborhood of $[0,1]^n$, restricted to $[0,1]^n$; note that the unrestricted sine function has infinitely many roots, and so cannot be definable in an o-minimal structure.)
- The complete theory of the real field with a symbol for the exponential function by Wilkie's theorem. More generally, the complete theory of the real numbers with Pfaffian functions added.
- The last two examples can be combined: given any o-minimal expansion of the real field (such as the real field with restricted analytic functions), one can define its Pfaffian closure, which is again an o-minimal structure. (The Pfaffian closure of a structure is, in particular, closed under Pfaffian chains where arbitrary definable functions are used in place of polynomials.)

In the case of RCF, the definable sets are the semialgebraic sets. Thus the study of o-minimal structures and theories generalises real algebraic geometry. A major line of current research is based on discovering expansions of the real ordered field that are o-minimal. Despite the generality of application, one can show a great deal about the geometry of set definable in o-minimal structures. There is a cell decomposition theorem, Whitney and Verdier stratification theorems and a good notion of dimension and Euler characteristic.

Moreover, continuously differentiable definable functions in an o-minimal structure satisfy a generalization of Łojasiewicz inequality, a property that has been used to guarantee the convergence of some non-smooth optimization methods, such as the stochastic subgradient method (under some mild assumptions).

== See also ==
- Semialgebraic set
- Real algebraic geometry
- Strongly minimal theory
- Weakly o-minimal structure
- C-minimal theory
- Tame topology
