= Amalgamation property =

Concept in model theory

A commutative diagram of the amalgamation property.

In the mathematical field of model theory, the amalgamation property is a property of collections of structures that guarantees, under certain conditions, that two structures in the collection can be regarded as substructures of a larger one.

This property plays a crucial role in Fraïssé's theorem, which characterises classes of finite structures that arise as ages of countable homogeneous structures.

The diagram of the amalgamation property appears in many areas of mathematical logic. Examples include in modal logic as an incestual accessibility relation, and in lambda calculus as a manner of reduction having the Church–Rosser property.

== Definition ==
An amalgam can be formally defined as a 5-tuple (A,f,B,g,C) such that A,B,C are structures having the same signature, and f: A → B, g: A → C are embeddings. Recall that f: A → B is an embedding if f is an injective morphism which induces an isomorphism from A to the substructure f(A) of B.

A class K of structures has the amalgamation property if for every amalgam with A,B,C ∈ K and A ≠ Ø, there exist both a structure D ∈ K and embeddings f': B → D, g': C → D such that

$$f'\circ f = g' \circ g. \,$$

A first-order theory $T$ has the amalgamation property if the class of models of $T$ has the amalgamation property. The amalgamation property has certain connections to quantifier elimination.

In general, the amalgamation property can be considered for a category with a specified choice of the class of morphisms (in place of embeddings). This notion is related to the categorical notion of a pushout, where D is supposed to be minimal in a suitable sense.

== Examples ==
- The class of sets, where the embeddings are injective functions, and if they are assumed to be inclusions then an amalgam is simply the union of the two sets.
- The class of free groups where the embeddings are injective homomorphisms, and (assuming they are inclusions) an amalgam is the quotient group $B*C/A$, where * is the free product.
- The class of finite linear orderings. This is due to the fact that any homogeneous structure from an amalgamation class of finite structure.

A similar but different notion to the amalgamation property is the joint embedding property. To see the difference, first consider the class K (or simply the set) containing three models with linear orders, L_{1} of size one, L_{2} of size two, and L_{3} of size three. This class K has the joint embedding property because all three models can be embedded into L_{3}. However, K does not have the amalgamation property. The counterexample for this starts with L_{1} containing a single element e and extends in two different ways to L_{3}, one in which e is the smallest and the other in which e is the largest. Now any common model with an embedding from these two extensions must be at least of size five so that there are two elements on either side of e.

Now consider the class of algebraically closed fields. This class has the amalgamation property since any two field extensions of a prime field can be embedded into a common field. However, two arbitrary fields cannot be embedded into a common field when the characteristic of the fields differ.

== Strong amalgamation property ==
A class K of structures has the strong amalgamation property (SAP), also called the disjoint amalgamation property (DAP), if for every amalgam with A,B,C ∈ K there exist both a structure D ∈ K and embeddings f': B → D, g': C → D such that

$$f' \circ f = g' \circ g \,$$

and

$$f '[B] \cap g '[C] = (f ' \circ f)[A] = (g ' \circ g)[A] \,$$

where for any set X and function h on X,

$$h \lbrack X \rbrack = \lbrace h(x) \mid x \in X \rbrace. \,$$

This property is related to the notion of a pullback.

== See also ==
- Span (category theory)
- Pushout (category theory)
- Joint embedding property
- Fraïssé's theorem
