= Jerzy Łoś =

Polish mathematician (1920–1998)

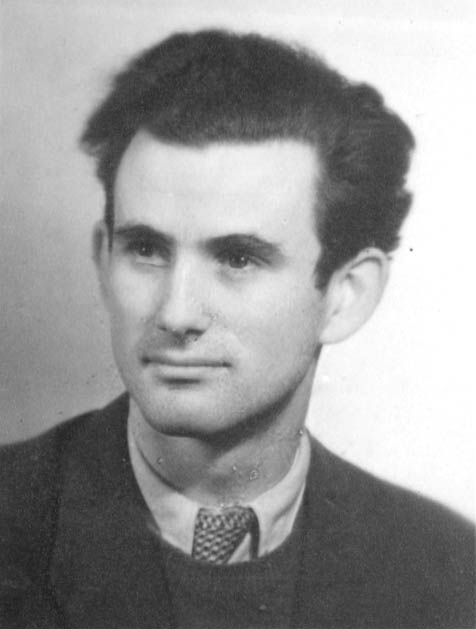
- Jerzy Łoś c.1955
- Born: 22 March 1920; Lwów, Second Polish Republic
- Died: 1 June 1998 (aged 78); Warsaw, Poland
- Education: University of Lviv
- Known for: Łoś's theorem Łoś–Tarski preservation theorem Łoś–Vaught test Łoś's positional logic Transfer principle Temporal logic
- Scientific career
- Fields: Mathematics; Logic; Economics; Philosophy
- Workplaces: University of Wrocław; Nicolaus Copernicus University; University of Warsaw
- Thesis: On Logical Matrices (1949)
- Doctoral advisor: Jerzy Słupecki

Jerzy Maria Michał Łoś (Polish: [ˈjɛʐɨ ˈwɔɕ]; born 22 March 1920 – 1 June 1998) was a Polish mathematician, logician, economist, and philosopher. He studied at the University of Lviv, and during his career held positions at several institutions including the University of Wrocław, the Polish Academy of Sciences and the University of Warsaw.

He is noted for his contributions to model theory (particularly Łoś's theorem), mathematical logic, Abelian group theory, and mathematical economics. In the late 1940s, he introduced some of the first systems of temporal and epistemic logic.

== Life and career ==
Łoś was born on 22 March 1920 in Lwów (now Lviv, Ukraine) in the Second Polish Republic as the son of Zygmunt, a Doctor of Law, and Zofia (née Roztworowska), a landowner and social activist. In 1937, he matriculated at the Jan Kazimierz University (now the University of Lviv), where he initially studied medicine before switching to philosophy and chemistry.

During World War II, Łoś worked as an official at a sugar factory in Lublin. After the war, he pursued his studies in philosophy at the Maria Curie-Skłodowska University in Lublin. In 1946, influenced by the writings of Jan Śleszyński, he published An Attempt to Axiomatise Traditional Logic in which he examined traditional logic, particularly the laws of immediate inference on the basis of relations between extensions of arguments. The following year, he received a master's degree on the basis of his work Analiza metodologiczna kanonów Milla (The Foundations of a Methodological Analysis of Mill's Method).

In 1947, Łoś relocated to Wrocław, where he worked as an assistant at the Faculty of Physics and later the Faculty of Logic of the University of Wrocław. Inspired by Hugo Steinhaus and Edward Marczewski, he started developing a greater interest in mathematics. In 1949, Łoś obtained his doctorate based on his dissertation O matrycach logicznych (On Logical Matrices) written under the supervision of Jerzy Słupecki. In the same year, he became a member of the Real Functions Group at the Institute of Mathematics of the Polish Academy of Sciences.

In 1952, Łoś started working at the Nicolaus Copernicus University in Toruń and was appointed head of the Group of Algebra of the Institute of Mathematics. He earned his habilitation there in 1955. In 1961, Łoś continued his academic career at the University of Warsaw where he shifted the focus of his research from foundations of mathematics and algebra to applied mathematics, game theory and economics. He held positions in three institutes there: first the Institute of Philosophy, then the Institute of Mathematics and finally the Institute of Computer Science. In 1967–1994, he sat on the editorial board of Fundamenta Mathematicae. In 1969, he served as acting president of the Polish Mathematical Society.

In 1974, Łoś was awarded the Knight's Cross of the Order of Polonia Restituta. In January 1976, Łoś was among the signatories of the Memorial 101, a protest letter of Polish intellectuals to the Extraordinary Commission of the Sejm opposing the proposed amendments to the Constitution of the Polish People's Republic. In 1983, he became a full member of the Polish Academy of Sciences, and in 1984, he joined the Warsaw Scientific Society. In 1986, he received the Sierpiński Medal conferred jointly by the University of Warsaw and the Polish Mathematical Society. In 1995, he accepted an honorary doctorate from the University of Hagen, Germany.

During his career, Łoś visited such institutions as University of California at Berkeley (where he conducted a seminar on model theory with Alfred Tarski), Aarhus University, Institut Henri Poincaré, Yale University and the University of Wisconsin.

In 1996, Łoś suffered from a severe brain stroke. He was thenceforward ill until his death in 1998 in Warsaw.

=== Contributions ===
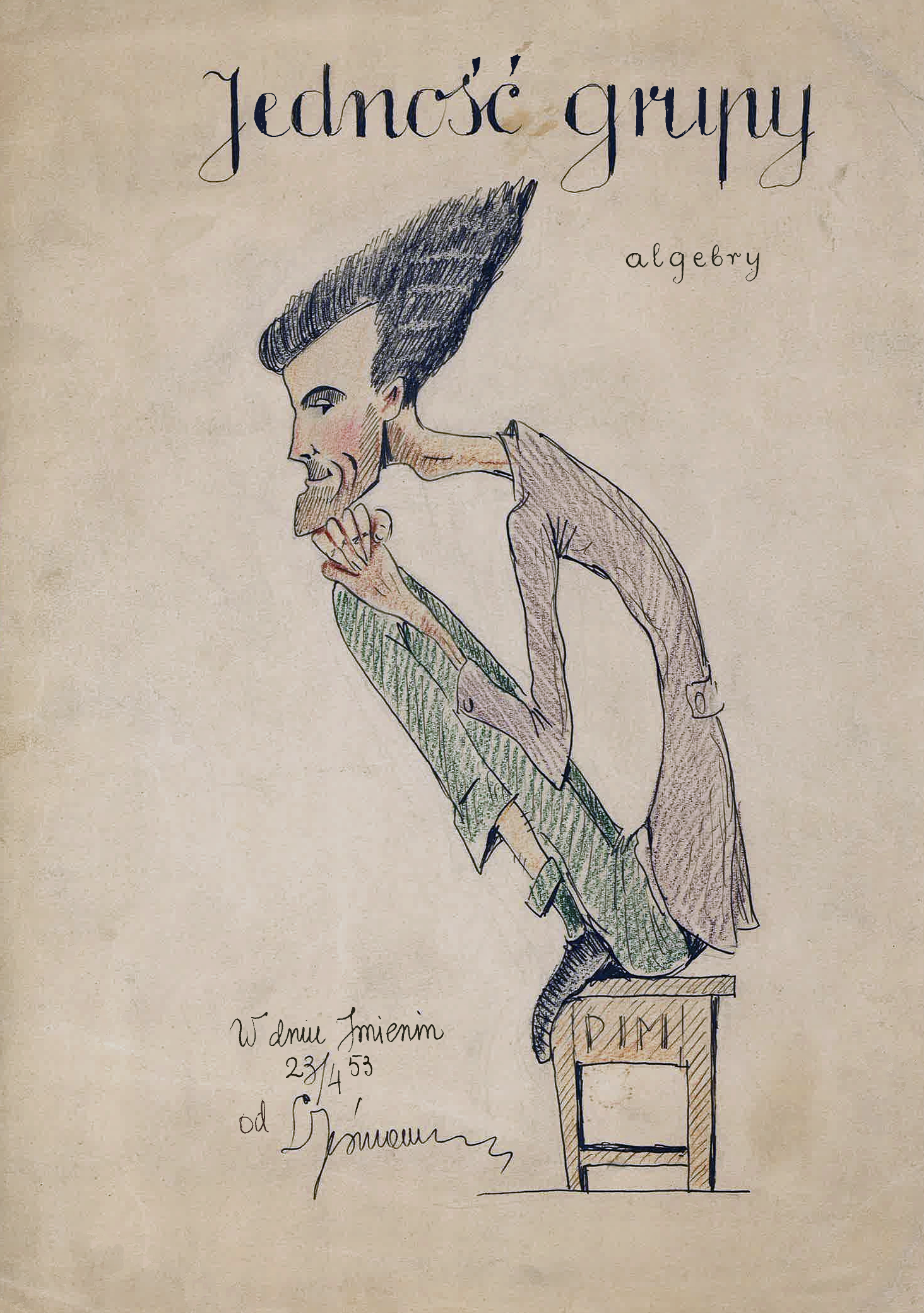
Jerzy Łoś caricature by Leon Jeśmanowicz, 1953

His 1947 master's thesis Analiza metodologiczna kanonów Milla (The Foundations of a Methodological Analysis of Mill's Method) is regarded as pioneering in the field of temporal logic. Arthur Prior references Łoś's work in his principal book on temporal logic, having learned about it through a review by Henryk Hiż.

In 1954, Jerzy Łoś and Robert Lawson Vaught independently established that a first-order theory having only infinite models is complete if it is categorical in some infinite cardinal greater than or equal to the cardinality of its language. It is now referred to as the Łoś-Vaught test and its applications include demonstrating that the theory of closed first-order logic formulas true on the Rado graph is complete.

He is especially known for his work in model theory, in particular for Łoś's theorem (also known as the Fundamental Theorem on Ultraproducts), which states that any first-order formula is true in an ultraproduct if and only if it is true in "most" factors. His conjecture on the categoricity of countable theories, later proved by Michael D. Morley, and in its uncountable form by Saharon Shelah, played a crucial role in stimulating the development of stability theory (logic), which became a major branch of model theory.

In model theory, he also proved many preservation theorems, including the Łoś–Tarski preservation theorem, which asserts that the set of formulas preserved under taking substructures is exactly the set of universal formulas.

He also gave significant contributions, as well, to foundations of mathematics, Abelian group theory and universal algebra. In the 60's he turned his attention to mathematical economics, focusing mainly on production processes and dynamic decision processes.

== See also ==
- List of Polish mathematicians
- Abstract algebraic logic
- Hyperreal number – Element of a nonstandard model of the reals, which can be infinite or infinitesimal
- Łoś–Vaught test
- Łoś's theorem – Mathematical construction
- Transfer principle – Concept in model theory

== Selected publications ==
- Łoś, Jerzy (1955) Quelques remarques, théorèmes et problèmes sur les classes définissables d'algèbres. Mathematical interpretation of formal systems, pp. 98–113. North-Holland Publishing Co., Amsterdam.

Academic offices
Preceded by Patrick Suppes	President of the DLMPST/IUHPST; 1979–1983	Succeeded by Dana Scott
