= Vaught conjecture =

The Vaught conjecture is a conjecture in the mathematical field of model theory originally proposed by Robert Lawson Vaught in 1961. It states that the number of non-isomorphic countable models of a first-order complete theory in a countable language is finite or ℵ_{0} or 2^{ℵ_{0}}. Morley showed that the number of countable models is finite or ℵ_{0} or ℵ_{1} or 2^{ℵ_{0}}, which solves the conjecture except for the case of ℵ_{1} models when the continuum hypothesis fails.

== Statement of the conjecture ==
Let $T$ be a first-order, countable, complete theory with infinite models. Let $I(T, \alpha)$ denote the number of models of T of cardinality $\alpha$ up to isomorphism—the spectrum of the theory $T$. Morley proved that if I(T, ℵ_{0}) is infinite then it must be ℵ_{0} or ℵ_{1} or the cardinality of the continuum. The Vaught conjecture is the statement that it is not possible for $\aleph_{0} < I(T,\aleph_{0}) < 2^{\aleph_{0}}$. The conjecture is a trivial consequence of the continuum hypothesis; so this axiom is often excluded in work on the conjecture. Alternatively, there is a sharper form of the conjecture that states that any countable complete T with uncountably many countable models will have a perfect set of uncountable models (as pointed out by John Steel, in "On Vaught's conjecture". Cabal Seminar 76–77 (Proc. Caltech-UCLA Logic Sem., 1976–77), pp. 193–208, Lecture Notes in Math., 689, Springer, Berlin, 1978, this form of the Vaught conjecture is equiprovable with the original).

=== Original formulation ===
The original formulation by Vaught was not stated as a conjecture, but as a problem: Can it be proved, without the use of the continuum hypothesis, that there exists a complete theory having exactly ℵ_{1} non-isomorphic denumerable models? By the result by Morley mentioned at the beginning, a positive solution to the conjecture essentially corresponds to a negative answer to Vaught's problem as originally stated.

== Vaught's theorem ==
Vaught proved that the number of countable models of a complete theory cannot be 2. It can be any finite number other than 2, for example:

- Any complete theory with a finite model has no countably infinite models.
- The theories with just one countable model are the ω-categorical theories. There are many examples of these, such as the theory of an infinite set, or the theory of a dense unbounded total order.
- Ehrenfeucht gave the following example of a theory with 3 countable models: the language has a relation ≥ and a countable number of constants c_{0}, c_{1}, ... with axioms stating that ≥ is a dense unbounded total order, and c_{0} < c_{1} < c_{2} < ... The three models differ according to whether this sequence is unbounded, or converges, or is bounded but does not converge.
- Ehrenfeucht's example can be modified to give a theory with any finite number n ≥ 3 of models by adding n − 2 unary relations P_{i} to the language, with axioms stating that for every x exactly one of the P_{i} is true, the values of y for which P_{i}(y) is true are dense, and P_{1} is true for all c_{i}. Then the models for which the sequence of elements c_{i} converge to a limit c split into n − 2 cases depending on for which i the relation P_{i}(c) is true.

The idea of the proof of Vaught's theorem is as follows. If there are at most countably many countable models, then there is a smallest one: the atomic model, and a largest one, the saturated model, which are different if there is more than one model. If they are different, the saturated model must realize some n-type omitted by the atomic model. Then one can show that an atomic model of the theory of structures realizing this n-type (in a language expanded by finitely many constants) is a third model, not isomorphic to either the atomic or the saturated model. In the example above with 3 models, the atomic model is the one where the sequence is unbounded, the saturated model is the one where the sequence converges, and an example of a type not realized by the atomic model is an element greater than all elements of the sequence.

== Topological Vaught conjecture ==
The topological Vaught conjecture is the statement that whenever a Polish group acts continuously on a Polish space, there are either countably many orbits or continuum many orbits. The topological Vaught conjecture is more general than the original Vaught conjecture: Given a countable language we can form the space of all structures on the natural numbers for that language. If we equip this with the topology generated by first-order formulas, then it is known from A. Gregorczyk, A. Mostowski, C. Ryll-Nardzewski, "Definability of sets of models of axiomatic theories" (Bulletin of the Polish Academy of Sciences (series Mathematics, Astronomy, Physics), vol. 9 (1961), pp. 163–7) that the resulting space is Polish. There is a continuous action of the infinite symmetric group (the collection of all permutations of the natural numbers with the topology of point-wise convergence) that gives rise to the equivalence relation of isomorphism. Given a complete first-order theory T, the set of structures satisfying T is a minimal, closed invariant set, and hence Polish in its own right.

== See also ==
- Spectrum of a theory
- Morley's categoricity theorem
