= Tarski's theorem =

Tarski's theorem may refer to the following theorems of Alfred Tarski:

- Tarski's theorem about choice
- Tarski's undefinability theorem
- Tarski's theorem on the completeness of the theory of real closed fields
- Knaster–Tarski theorem (sometimes referred to as Tarski's fixed point theorem)
- Tarski–Seidenberg theorem
- Some fixed point theorems, usually variants of the Kleene fixed-point theorem, are referred to the Tarski–Kantorovitch fixed–point principle or the Tarski–Kantorovitch theorem although the use of this terminology is limited.
- The Tarski–Vaught test

== See also ==
- List of things named after Alfred Tarski
