= Lars Svenonius =

Swedish logician and philosopher

Lars Svenonius (June 16, 1927, Skellefteå – September 27, 2010, Silver Spring, Maryland) was a Swedish logician and philosopher.

He was a visiting professor at University of California at Berkeley in 1962–63, then held a position at the University of Chicago from 1963 to 1969, and was professor of philosophy at the University of Maryland from 1969 to 2009. He retired in 2009, but was awarded the position of emeritus professor, and continued to teach courses and advise students until his death at 83 years of age.

He was the first Swedish logician to work on model theory with his dissertation Some problems in Model Theory (for which the University of Uppsala awarded him a doctorate in 1960). His early work was in formal logic, and he established a reputation for brilliance early in his career with a series of proofs, including an independent proof of equivalent characterizations of omega-categorical theories. A 1959 paper of his in Theoria establishes what is still referred to as the 'Svenonius theorem' on decidability. One of his proponents in Sweden was Per Lindström.

Lars Svenonius' early work was in the field of logic known as model theory, in which properties of the interpretations ("models") of theories are studied. This field was the object of intense study and saw great progress in the 1950s, largely due to the work of Alfred Tarski and his students at the University of California, Berkeley. At the same time it became much more mathematical, both in techniques and in the concepts used. Svenonius' work was of the modern mathematical variety.

Svenonius' reputation as a mathematical model theorist was established with the publication of three papers in Theoria in 1959 and 1960:

1. $\aleph_0$-categoricity in first-order predicate calculus,
2. A theorem on permutations in models,
3. On minimal models of first-order systems.

In particular, paper (2) contains what is now called "Svenonius' Theorem", an important result on definability of predicates in first order theories. Even the statement of this result requires mathematical model-theoretic concepts. It states that if the interpretation of a predicate in any model of a first-order theory is invariant under permutations ("automorphisms") of the model fixing the other predicates, then the interpretation of that predicate is definable in every model by a formula involving only the other predicates; furthermore only finitely many such defining formulas are required. Beth's earlier definability theorem is a consequence of Svenonius' Theorem.

The other two papers include a characterization of theories having only one countable model, obtained also by the Polish logician Czesław Ryll-Nardzewski, and results on prime models, obtained also by Robert Vaught at Berkeley. All of these results are classics of modern model theory.

Presumably as a result of these papers he was named a visiting associate professor at The University of California, Berkeley, for 1962–1963, and gave an Invited Address at the International Symposium on the Theory of Models held there in 1963. His address was published in the Conference Proceedings (The Theory of Models, North-Holland Publishing Co., 1965) as "On the denumerable models of theories with extra predicates", pp 376–389. In this paper he characterizes the countable ("denumerable") structures which can be made into models of a theory by adding interpretations of the extra predicates used in defining the theory. His characterization involves (infinite) expressions beginning with an infinite sequence of alternating quantifiers. Such expressions are now interpreted using infinite two-person games. The importance of this work was only realized after it was rediscovered and extended by Robert Vaught in his work on descriptive set theory and infinitary logics. Svenonius' role is well recognized, for example, by Wilfrid Hodges who defines "Svenonius games" and "Svenonius sentences" in his encyclopedic treatise Model Theory (Cambridge University Press, 1993).
