= Ryll-Nardzewski theorem =

In mathematics, Ryll-Nardzewski theorem can mean either

- Ryll-Nardzewski fixed-point theorem
- A theorem in Omega-categorical theory
- Kuratowski and Ryll-Nardzewski measurable selection theorem
