= Svenonius =

Svenonius is a Swedish surname. Notable people with the surname include:

- Elaine Svenonius, American librarian and library scholar
- Ian Svenonius (born 1968), American musician and singer
- Lars Svenonius (1927–2010), Swedish logician and philosopher
