= Denis Miéville =

Swiss mathematician (1946–2018)

Denis Miéville (15 September 1946 – 27 October 2018) was a Swiss expert on the logic of Stanislaw Lesniewski and natural logic.

== Biography ==
Denis Miéville was raised in the towns of Colombier (Canton of Neuchâtel) and Essert-Pittet (Canton of Vaud). After studying mathematics and logic at the University of Neuchâtel (Switzerland) and Bowling Green University (Ohio, United States), Denis Miéville developed an interest in the development and formalization of natural logic that led him to study both the theory of collective classes and the foundations of maximal predicates in propositional logic. These interests were integrated in the doctoral thesis that he defended in 1984 ("A Development of Stanislaw Lesniewski's logical systems: Protothetic, ontology and mereology") at the University of Neuchâtel, supervised by the eminent logician Jean-Blaise Grize. Appointed Professor at the University of Neuchâtel in 1987 (he will become its rector from 1999 to 2003), he taught logic and chaired the Semiologic Research Centre.

Professor Miéville has taught at various institutions such as the University of Geneva, the University of Rennes in France and the University of Iasi in Romania. The University of Iasi awarded him a degree Honoris causa in 2003. He also received the Honorary Certificate of the Francophony in 2001.

== Research interests ==
Professor Miéville developed an expertise on Lesniewski's logic due to his interest in developmental systems, that have the advantage of being dynamic, universal, free and of a higher order. Moreover, by developing a theory of syntactic-semantic categories, he focussed on a methodology able to identify logico-discursive indices in texts, by representing them as argumentative and reasoned structures. His interests became more and more inclined towards understanding the way in which discursive thought creates meaning, by inscribing it into reasoning networks. This is one of the reasons that led Professor Miéville to specifically examine the discursive procedures from which new knowledge is developed, such as those proceeding by analogy, and those structuring creative definitions. Very sensitive to the epistemological dimension of knowledge, he has been interested in how concepts develop gradually and crystallize into stable entities.

== Publications ==
=== Books ===
- Introduction à l'œuvre de S. Leśniewski. VI: La métalangue d'une syntaxe inscriptionnelle, Neuchâtel, Travaux de logique, 2009.
- Introduction à l'œuvre de S. Leśniewski. II. L'Ontologie. Neuchâtel, Travaux de logique, 2004.
- Introduction à l'œuvre de S. Leśniewski. I. La Protothétique. Neuchâtel, Travaux de logique, 2001.
- Pensée logico-mathématique. Nouveaux objets interdisciplinaires. Paris: P.U.F., 1993 (Collaboration with O. Houdé).
- Essai de logique naturelle. Berne, Lang, 1992 (Collaboration with J.-B. Grize and M.-J. Borel)

=== Scientific editor ===
- Stanislaw Leśniewski aujourd’hui (Ed., with Denis Vernant), Grenoble/Neuchâtel, Groupe de Recherches sur la philosophie et le langage/ Centre de Recherches Sémiologiques 1995.
