= Bertić =

Bertić is a Croatian surname. Notable people with the surname include:

- Vatroslav Bertić (1818–1901), Croatian mathematician
- Živko Bertić (1875–1938), Croatian and Yugoslavian politician and writer
