= Bonnie Gold =

American mathematics educator

Bonnie Gold (born 1948) is an American mathematician, mathematical logician, philosopher of mathematics, and mathematics educator. She is a professor emerita of mathematics at Monmouth University.

== Education and career ==
Gold completed her Ph.D. in 1976 at Cornell University, under the supervision of Michael D. Morley.

She was the chair of the mathematics department at Wabash College before moving to Monmouth, where she also became department chair.

== Contributions ==
The research from Gold's dissertation, Compact and $\omega$-compact formulas in $L_{\omega_{1},\omega}$, was later published in the journal Archiv für Mathematische Logik und Grundlagenforschung, and concerned infinitary logic.

With Sandra Z. Keith and William A. Marion she co-edited Assessment Practices in Undergraduate Mathematics, published by the Mathematical Association of America (MAA) in 1999. With Roger A. Simons, Gold is also the editor of another book, Proof and Other Dilemmas: Mathematics and Philosophy (MAA, 2008).

Her essay "How your philosophy of mathematics impacts your teaching" was selected for inclusion in The Best Writing on Mathematics 2012. In it, she argues that the philosophy of mathematics affects the teaching of mathematics even when the teacher's philosophical principles are implicit and unexamined.

== Recognition ==
In 2012, Gold became the winner of the 22nd Louise Hay Award of the Association for Women in Mathematics for her contributions to mathematics education. The award citation noted her work in educational assessment for undergraduate study in mathematics.
