= Łoś–Vaught test =

In model theory, a branch of mathematical logic, the Łoś–Vaught test is a criterion for a theory to be complete, unable to be augmented without becoming inconsistent. For theories in classical logic, this means that for every sentence, the theory contains either the sentence or its negation but not both.

== Statement ==
A theory $T$ with signature σ is $\kappa$-categorical for an infinite cardinal $\kappa$ if $T$ has exactly one model (up to isomorphism) of cardinality $\kappa.$

The Łoś–Vaught test states that if a first-order satisfiable theory is $\kappa$-categorical for some $\kappa \geq |\sigma|$ and has no finite model, then it is complete.

This theorem was proved independently by Jerzy Łoś (1954) and Robert L. Vaught (1954), after whom it is named.

== Applications ==
The Łoś–Vaught test is used to prove that the theory of closed first-order logic formulas true on the Rado graph is complete.

== See also ==
- Robinson's joint consistency theorem – Theorem of mathematical logic
