= Solomon Feferman =

American philosopher and mathematician

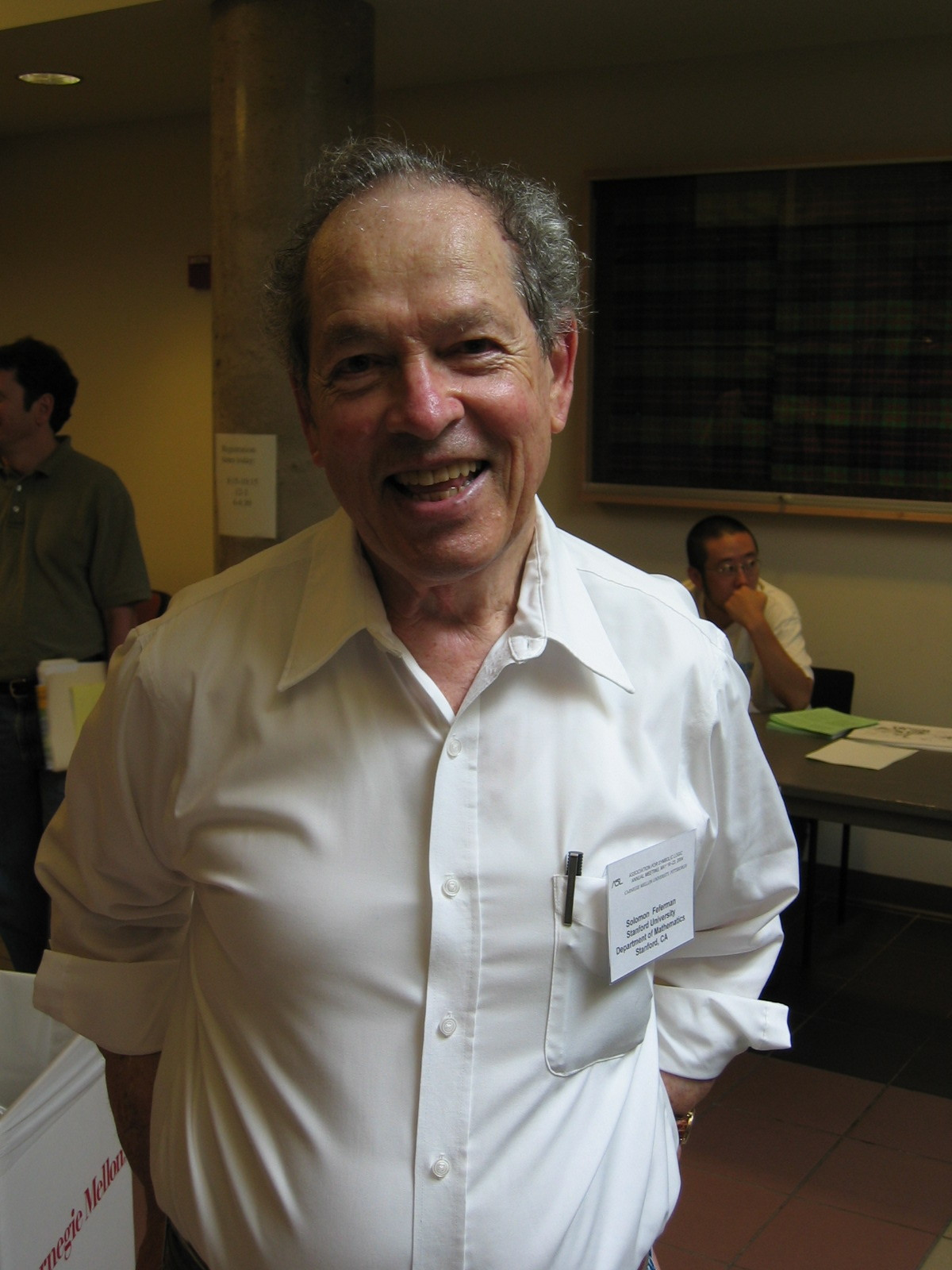
- Solomon Feferman at the Association of Symbolic Logic, Pittsburgh, May 2004
- Born: December 13, 1928; New York City, US
- Died: July 26, 2016 (aged 87); Stanford, California, US

Education
- Education: California Institute of Technology (BS); University of California, Berkeley (PhD)
- Thesis: Formal Consistency Proofs and Interpretability of Theories (1957)
- Doctoral advisor: Alfred Tarski

Philosophical work
- Era: Contemporary philosophy
- Region: Western philosophy
- School: Analytic; Predicativism
- Doctoral students: Jon Barwise; Thomas Hofweber; Carolyn Talcott; Bienvenido Nebres
- Main interests: Philosophy of mathematics Proof theory Theory of computation
- Notable ideas: Stratified systems for the foundations of category theory Feferman–Schütte ordinal Ordinal collapsing function Explicit mathematics Feferman–Vaught theorem
- Website: Official website

Solomon Feferman (/ˈfɛfərmən/; December 13, 1928 – July 26, 2016) was an American philosopher and mathematician who worked in mathematical logic. In addition to his prolific technical work in proof theory, computability theory, and set theory, he was known for his contributions to the history of logic (for instance, via biographical writings on figures such as Kurt Gödel, Alfred Tarski, and Jean van Heijenoort) and as a vocal proponent of the philosophy of mathematics known as predicativism, notably from an anti-platonist stance.

== Life ==
Solomon Feferman was born in The Bronx in New York City to working-class parents who had immigrated to the United States after World War I and had met and married in New York. Neither parent had any advanced education. The family moved to Los Angeles, where Feferman graduated from high school at age 16.

He received his B.S. from the California Institute of Technology in 1948, and in 1957 his Ph.D. in mathematics from the University of California, Berkeley, under Alfred Tarski, after having been drafted and having served in the U.S. Army from 1953 to 1955. In 1956 he was appointed to the Departments of Mathematics and Philosophy at Stanford University, where he later became the Patrick Suppes Professor of Humanities and Sciences. While the majority of his career was spent at Stanford, he also spent time as a post-doctoral fellow at the Institute for Advanced Study in Princeton, a visiting professor at MIT, and a visiting fellow at the University of Oxford (Wolfson College and All Souls College).

Feferman died on 26 July 2016 at his home in Stanford, following an illness that lasted three months and a stroke. At his death, he had been a member of the Mathematical Association of America for 37 years.

== Contributions ==
Feferman was editor-in-chief of the five-volume Collected Works of Kurt Gödel, published by Oxford University Press between 2001 and 2013.

In 2004, together with his wife Anita Burdman Feferman, he published a biography of Alfred Tarski, Alfred Tarski: Life and Logic.

Influenced by the writings of Hermann Weyl, he worked on predicative mathematics. In particular, he introduced the Feferman–Schütte ordinal as a measure of the strength of certain predicative systems.

== Recognition ==
Feferman was awarded Guggenheim Fellowships in 1972 and 1986 and the Rolf Schock Prize in logic and philosophy in 2003. He was invited to give the Gödel Lecture in 1997 and the Tarski Lectures in 2006. In 2012, he became a fellow of the American Mathematical Society.

== Publications ==
=== Papers ===
- Feferman, Solomon; Vaught, Robert L. (1959), "The first order properties of products of algebraic systems", Fund. Math. 47, 57–103.
- Feferman, Solomon (1975), "A language and axioms for explicit mathematics", Algebra and logic (Fourteenth Summer Res. Inst., Austral. Math. Soc., Monash Univ., Clayton, 1974), pp. 87–139, Lecture Notes in Math., vol. 450, Berlin, Springer.
- Feferman, Solomon (1979), "Constructive theories of functions and classes", Logic Colloquium '78 (Mons, 1978), pp. 159–224, Stud. Logic Foundations Math., 97, Amsterdam, New York, North-Holland.
- Buchholz, Wilfried; Feferman, Solomon; Pohlers, Wolfram; Sieg, Wilfried (1981), "Iterated inductive definitions and subsystems of analysis: recent proof-theoretical studies", Lecture Notes in Mathematics, 897, Berlin, New York, Springer-Verlag.
- Feferman, Solomon; Hellman, Geoffrey (1995), "Predicative foundations of arithmetic", J. Philos. Logic 24 (1), 1–17.
- Avigad, Jeremy; Feferman, Solomon (1998), "Gödel's functional (Dialectica) interpretation", Handbook of proof theory, 337–405, Stud. Logic Found. Math., 137, Amsterdam, North-Holland.

=== Books ===
- Feferman, Solomon (1964) The Number Systems, Foundations of Algebra and Analysis Addison Wesley. Library of Congress Catalog No.63-12470
- Feferman, Solomon. (1998). In the Light of Logic. Oxford University Press. ISBN 0-19-508030-0, Logic and Computation in Philosophy series.
- Feferman, Anita Burdman; Feferman, Solomon (2004). Alfred Tarski: Life and Logic. Cambridge University Press. ISBN 978-0-521-80240-6. OCLC 54691904.

== See also ==
- Criticism of non-standard analysis
