= Computable model theory =

Branch of model theory that deals with computation

Computable model theory is a branch of model theory that deals with questions of computability as they apply to model-theoretic structures. Computable model theory introduces the ideas of computable and decidable models and theories, and one of the basic problems is discovering whether or not computable or decidable models fulfilling certain model-theoretic conditions can be shown to exist.

Computable model theory was developed almost simultaneously by mathematicians in the West, primarily located in the United States and Australia, and Soviet Russia during the middle of the 20th century. Because of the Cold War there was little communication between these two groups and so a number of important results were discovered independently.

== See also ==
- Vaught conjecture
