= List of things named after Alfred Tarski =

In the history of mathematics, Alfred Tarski (1901–1983) is one of the most important logicians. His name is now associated with a number of theorems and concepts in that field.

== Theorems ==
- Łoś–Tarski preservation theorem
- Knaster–Tarski theorem (sometimes referred to as Tarski's fixed point theorem)
- Tarski's undefinability theorem
- Tarski–Seidenberg theorem
- Some fixed point theorems, usually variants of the Kleene fixed-point theorem, are referred to the Tarski–Kantorovitch fixed–point principle or the Tarski–Kantorovitch theorem although the use of this terminology is limited.
- Tarski's theorem

== Other mathematics-related work ==
- Bernays-Tarski axiom system
- Banach–Tarski paradox
- Lindenbaum–Tarski algebra
- Łukasiewicz-Tarski logic
- Jónsson–Tarski duality
- Jónsson–Tarski algebra
- Gödel–McKinsey–Tarski translation
- The semantic theory of truth is sometimes referred to as Tarski's definition of truth or Tarski's truth definitions.
- Tarski's axiomatization of the reals
- Tarski's axioms for plane geometry
- Tarski's circle-squaring problem
- Tarski's exponential function problem
- Tarski–Grothendieck set theory
- Tarski's high school algebra problem
- Tarski–Kuratowski algorithm
- Tarski monster group
- Tarski's plank problem
- Tarski's problems for free groups
- Tarski–Vaught test
- Tarski's World

== Other ==
- 13672 Tarski, a main-belt asteroid
- In 2019, Polish entomologist Marcin Kamiński named a newly discovered species of South African darkling beetle, Machleida tarskii, in honor of Alfred Tarski's contributions to science.
