= Anita Burdman Feferman =

American historian of mathematics and biographer

Anita Burdman Feferman (July 27, 1927 – April 9, 2015) was an American historian of mathematics and biographer, known for her biographies of Jean van Heijenoort and (with her husband, logician Solomon Feferman) of Alfred Tarski.

== Life ==
Feferman was born on July 27, 1927. She was originally from Los Angeles, and attended Hollywood High School and the University of California, Los Angeles before earning a bachelor's degree in 1948 from the University of California, Berkeley. She became a schoolteacher in the Oakland, California school system, and earned another degree in teaching from UC Berkeley. In 1956 her husband Solomon Feferman took a position at Stanford University, and she moved with him and their two daughters from the East Bay to the San Francisco Peninsula. She died on April 9, 2015.

== Books ==
At Stanford, Feferman became a member of a biography seminar led by Barbara A. Babcock and Diane Middlebrook. Her first biography, of Jean van Heijenoort, was Politics, Logic, and Love: The Life of Jean van Heijenoort (Jones and Bartlett, 1993), also published as From Trotsky to Gödel: The Life of Jean van Heijenoort (CRC Press, 2001). With Solomon Feferman, she was the co-author of a biography of Alfred Tarski, Alfred Tarski: Life and Logic (Cambridge University Press, 2004).
