= Roger Maddux =

American mathematician

Roger Maddux (born 1948) is an American mathematician specializing in algebraic logic.

He completed his B.A. at Pomona College in 1969, and his Ph.D. in mathematics at the University of California, Berkeley in 1978, where he was one of Alfred Tarski's last students. His career has been at Iowa State University, where he fills a joint appointment in computer science and mathematics.

Maddux is primarily known for his work in relation algebras and cylindric algebras, and as the inventor of relational bases.

== Books by Maddux ==
- 1990: (with Clifford H. Bergman & Don L. Pigozzi, editors) Algebraic Logic and Universal Algebra in Computer Science, Lecture Notes in Computer Science #425, Springer books
- 2006: Relation Algebras, vol. 150 in Studies in Logic and the Foundations of Mathematics. Elsevier Science
