= Jerzy Słupecki =

Polish mathematician and logician

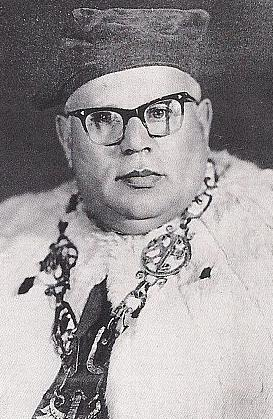
Jerzy Słupecki

Jerzy Słupecki (1904–1987) was a Polish mathematician and logician.

== Life ==
He attended the seminar of, and wrote a 1938 doctorate under, Jan Łukasiewicz.

During WWII he was active in Żegota.

In 1963, when at Wroclaw University, where he had been since 1945, he became editor of Studia Logica.

== Works ==
Słupecki showed how the many-valued logics of Łukasiewicz could be included in the theory of Post systems, and gave a functionally complete version of the three-valued logic. In the logic of categorical sentences, he found a rule that made the theory decidable; his work on Aristotle's logic, from 1948, was later reprinted in French.

He also continued the work of Stanisław Leśniewski, and wrote on his system ("protothetics") in 1953, in Studia Logica. A survey, "The Logical Works of Jerzy Slupecki", appeared in Studia Logica XLVIII (1989), by Jan Woleński and Jan Zygmunt.

He published:

- Z zagadnień logiki i filozofii: pisma wybrane (1961, editor), selected works of Jan Łukasiewicz
- Elements of Mathematical Logic and Set Theory (1967)
