= Omega-categorical theory =

Mathematical logic theory with exactly one countably infinite model up to isomorphism

In mathematical logic, an omega-categorical theory is a theory that has exactly one countably infinite model up to isomorphism. Omega-categoricity is the special case κ = $\aleph_0$ = ω of κ-categoricity, and omega-categorical theories are also referred to as ω-categorical. The notion is most important for countable first-order theories.

== Equivalent conditions for omega-categoricity ==
Many conditions on a theory are equivalent to the property of omega-categoricity. In 1959 Erwin Engeler, Czesław Ryll-Nardzewski and Lars Svenonius, proved several independently. Despite this, the literature still widely refers to the Ryll-Nardzewski theorem as a name for these conditions. The conditions included with the theorem vary between authors.

Given a countable complete first-order theory T with infinite models, the following are equivalent:

- The theory T is omega-categorical.
- Every countable model of T has an oligomorphic automorphism group (that is, there are finitely many orbits on M^{n} for every n).
- Some countable model of T has an oligomorphic automorphism group.
- The theory T has a model which, for every natural number n, realizes only finitely many n-types, that is, the Stone space S_{n}(T) is finite.
- For every natural number n, T has only finitely many n-types.
- For every natural number n, every n-type is isolated.
- For every natural number n, up to equivalence modulo T there are only finitely many formulas with n free variables, in other words, for every n, the nth Lindenbaum–Tarski algebra of T is finite.
- Every model of T is atomic.
- Every countable model of T is atomic.
- The theory T has a countable atomic and saturated model.
- The theory T has a saturated prime model.

== Examples ==
The theory of any countably infinite structure which is homogeneous over a finite relational language is omega-categorical. More generally, the theory of the Fraïssé limit of any uniformly locally finite Fraïssé class is omega-categorical. Hence, the following theories are omega-categorical:

- The theory of dense linear orders without endpoints (Cantor's isomorphism theorem)
- The theory of the Rado graph
- The theory of infinite linear spaces over any finite field
- The theory of atomless Boolean algebras
