= Ryll-Nardzewski fixed-point theorem =

In functional analysis, a branch of mathematics, the Ryll-Nardzewski fixed-point theorem states that if $E$ is a normed vector space and $K$ is a nonempty convex subset of $E$ that is compact under the weak topology, then every group (or equivalently: every semigroup) of affine isometries of $K$ has at least one fixed point. (Here, a fixed point of a set of maps is a point that is fixed by each map in the set.)

This theorem was announced by Czesław Ryll-Nardzewski. Later Namioka and Asplund gave a proof based on a different approach. Ryll-Nardzewski himself gave a complete proof in the original spirit.

== Applications ==
The Ryll-Nardzewski theorem yields the existence of a Haar measure on compact groups.

== See also ==
- Fixed-point theorems
- Fixed-point theorems in infinite-dimensional spaces
- Markov-Kakutani fixed-point theorem - abelian semigroup of continuous affine self-maps on compact convex set in a topological vector space has a fixed point
