= Michael D. Morley =

American mathematician (1930–2020)

Michael Darwin Morley
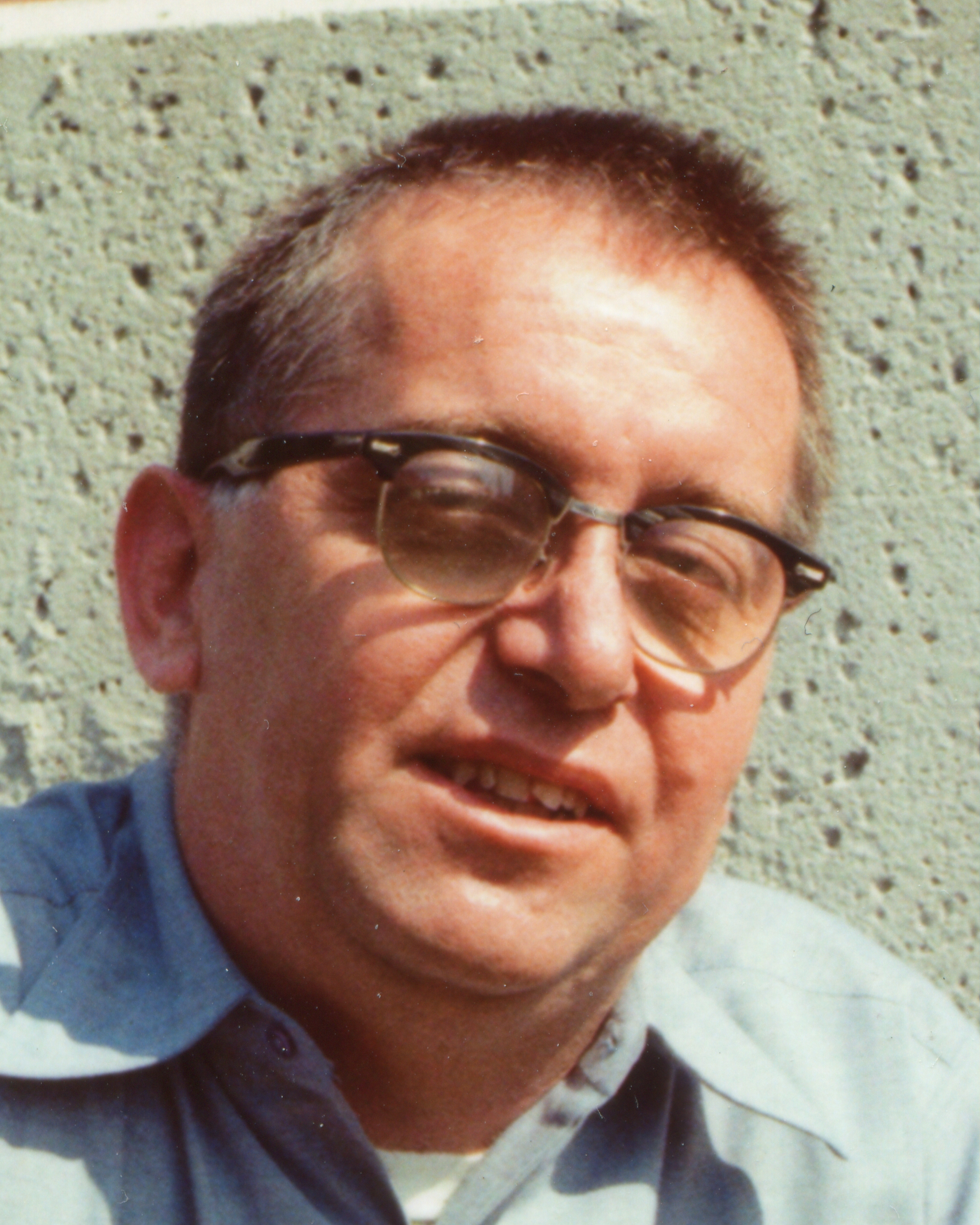
- Morley in Berkeley in 1973
- Born: September 29, 1930; Youngstown, Ohio
- Died: October 11, 2020 (aged 90); Sayre, Pennsylvania
- Spouse: Vivienne Esta Morley
- Awards: Leroy P. Steele Prize (2003)
- Scientific career
- Fields: Mathematics
- Workplaces: Cornell University
- Thesis: Categoricity in Power (1962)
- Doctoral advisor: Saunders Mac Lane; Robert Vaught
- Doctoral students: Bonnie Gold

Michael Darwin Morley (September 29, 1930 – October 11, 2020) was an American mathematician. At his death in 2020, Morley was professor emeritus at Cornell University. His research was in mathematical logic and model theory, and he is best known for Morley's categoricity theorem, which he proved in his PhD thesis Categoricity in Power in 1962.

== Early life and education ==
Morley was born in Youngstown, Ohio, on September 29, 1930. He obtained his BS in mathematics from Case Institute of Technology in 1951 and his PhD in mathematics from the University of Chicago in 1962. Morley's formal PhD advisor at the University of Chicago was Saunders Mac Lane, but he completed his thesis under the guidance of Robert Vaught at the University of California, Berkeley. His dissertation was titled Categoricity in Power.

== Career ==
Morley was an assistant professor at the University of Wisconsin–Madison from 1963 to 1967. He joined the faculty at Cornell University in 1967 as an associate professor, was promoted to professor in 1970, and became a professor emeritus in 2003. He served as president of the Association for Symbolic Logic from 1986 to 1989.

Morley received the 2003 Leroy P. Steele Prize for Seminal Contribution to Research from the American Mathematical Society for his 1965 paper "Categoricity in Power". This paper, his doctoral dissertation, introduced Morley rank and proved Morley's categoricity theorem.

== Personal life ==
Morley died on October 11, 2020, in Sayre, Pennsylvania.

== Selected publications ==
- Morley, Michael (1965). "Categoricity in power". Trans. Amer. Math. Soc. 114 (2): 514–538. doi:10.1090/S0002-9947-1965-0175782-0.

== See also ==
- Morley's problem
