= Leśniewski =

Leśniewski (feminine Leśniewska) is a Polish surname. Notable people with the surname include:

- Marek Leśniewski (born 1963), Polish cyclist
- Stanisław Leśniewski (1886–1939), Polish mathematician, philosopher, and logician
