= Vatroslav Bertić =

Croatian mathematician

Vatroslav Bertić (7 June 1818 – 1901) was a Croatian mathematician.

== Life ==
Bertić was born in Orehovica near Bedekovčina. His parents were Josip Jakov Bertić and noble Regina Antonija Gregoroczy (Gregurovečki). By his father's side he was of military background and by his mother's side he was connected with old Croatian nobility such as the Deželić and Gregurovečki families. He studied technical sciences in Budapest and was later employed by Croatian Ban Josip Jelačić in the military.

Bertić worked on the mathematical education and numeracy of the Croatian people. He coined a Croatian term for mathematics - oloslovlje.

Bertić was married to Amalija Kaltneker with whom he had five children. He died in Hum Zabočki in 1901.

== Work in logic ==
In 1847 Bertić wrote a book named Samouka – pokus pervi in which he offered a rudimentary algebraic language of “thoughts and concepts” (including variables, constants, equality sign) to which the law of substitution is added, which was the beginning stage of Boolean logic. Bertić made his research independent from George Boole.
