= Czesław Ryll-Nardzewski =

Polish mathematician (1926–2015)

- Born: 7 October 1926; Wilno, Second Polish Republic
- Died: 18 September 2015 (aged 88); Wrocław, Poland
- Known for: Ryll-Nardzewski fixed point theorem Ryll-Nardzewski theorem Kuratowski and Ryll-Nardzewski measurable selection theorem
- Scientific career
- Fields: Mathematics
- Institutions: Wrocław University of Technology; Warsaw University
- Doctoral advisor: Mieczysław Biernacki

Czesław Ryll-Nardzewski (Polish: [ˈt͡ʂɛswaf ˈrɨl narˈd͡zɛfskʲi]; 7 October 1926 – 18 September 2015) was a Polish mathematician.

== Life and career ==
Born in Wilno, Second Polish Republic (now Vilnius, Lithuania), he was a student of Hugo Steinhaus. At the age of 26 he became professor at Warsaw University. In 1959, he became a professor at the Wrocław University of Technology. He was the advisor of 18 PhD theses. His main research areas were measure theory, functional analysis, foundations of mathematics and probability theory. Several theorems bear his name: the Ryll-Nardzewski fixed point theorem, the Ryll-Nardzewski theorem in model theory, and the Kuratowski and Ryll-Nardzewski measurable selection theorem.

He became a member of the Polish Academy of Sciences in 1967. He died in 2015 at the age of 88 and he is buried in Wrocław at Grabiszyński Cemetery.
