= Categorical theory =

Type of theory in mathematical logic

In mathematical logic, a theory is categorical if it has exactly one model (up to isomorphism). (Note: Some authors define a theory to be categorical if all of its models are isomorphic. This definition makes the inconsistent theory categorical, since it has no models and therefore vacuously meets the criterion.) Such a theory can be viewed as defining its model, uniquely characterizing the model's structure.

In first-order logic, only theories with a finite model can be categorical, due to the upward Löwenheim–Skolem theorem. Higher-order logic contains categorical theories with an infinite model. For example, the second-order Peano axioms are categorical, having a unique model whose domain is the set of natural numbers $\mathbb{N}.$

In model theory, the notion of a categorical theory is refined with respect to cardinality. A theory is κ-categorical (or categorical in κ) if it has exactly one model of cardinality κ up to isomorphism. Morley's categoricity theorem is a theorem of stating that if a first-order theory in a countable language is categorical in some uncountable cardinality, then it is categorical in all uncountable cardinalities.

Saharon Shelah (1974) extended Morley's theorem to uncountable languages: if the language has cardinality κ and a theory is categorical in some uncountable cardinal greater than or equal to κ then it is categorical in all cardinalities greater than κ.

== History and motivation ==
Oswald Veblen in 1904 defined a theory to be categorical if all of its models are isomorphic.

By the upward Löwenheim–Skolem theorem, if a first-order theory has a model of infinite cardinality $\kappa$, then it has a model of any cardinality $\kappa' > \kappa$. So it cannot be categorical. One is then immediately led to the more subtle notion of κ-categoricity, which asks: for which cardinals κ is there exactly one model of cardinality κ of the given theory T up to isomorphism? In the language of spectrum, let $I(T, \kappa)$ be the number of non-isomorphic models of T of cardinality κ, then T is κ-categorical iff $I(T, \kappa) = 1$.

By the completeness theorem, if T is not complete, then it cannot be κ-categorical for any κ. Consequently, categoricity is only interesting in the case where T is consistent and complete.

For the special case of a consistent and complete theory T over a countable language, the downward and upward Löwenheim–Skolem theorems, plus the completeness theorem, implies that $I(T, \kappa) \geq 1$ for all infinite κ.

In 1954 Jerzy Łoś noticed that, if T is a consistent and complete theory over a countable language, with at least one infinite model, he could only find three ways for T to be κ-categorical at some κ:

- T is uncountably categorical, i.e. T is κ-categorical if and only if κ is an uncountable cardinal.
- T is countably categorical, i.e. T is κ-categorical if and only if κ is a countable cardinal.
- T is totally categorical, i.e. T is κ-categorical for all infinite cardinals κ.

| -categorical | countable | uncountable |
|---|---|---|
| countably | Yes | No |
| uncountably | No | Yes |
| totally | Yes | Yes |

This observation spurred a great amount of research into the 1960s. Michael Morley's categoricity theorem (1965) confirms that these are the only possibilities:

Morley's categoricity theorem (Morley 1965)—If T is a consistent and complete theory over a countable language, with at least one infinite model, then T is κ-categorical at some uncountable κ, if and only if it is κ-categorical at all uncountable κ.

The theory was subsequently extended and refined by Saharon Shelah in the 1970s and beyond, leading to stability theory and Shelah's more general programme of classification theory.

== Examples ==
There are not many natural examples of theories that are categorical in some uncountable cardinal. The known examples include:

- Pure identity theory (with no functions, constants, predicates other than "=", or axioms).
- The classic example is the theory of algebraically closed fields of a given characteristic. Categoricity does not say that all algebraically closed fields of characteristic 0 as large as the complex numbers C are the same as C; it only asserts that they are isomorphic as fields to C. It follows that although the completed p-adic closures C_{p} are all isomorphic as fields to C, they may (and in fact do) have completely different topological and analytic properties. The theory of algebraically closed fields of a given characteristic is not categorical in ω (the countable infinite cardinal); there are models of transcendence degree 0, 1, 2, ..., ω.
- Vector spaces over a given countable field. This includes abelian groups of given prime exponent (essentially the same as vector spaces over a finite field) and divisible torsion-free abelian groups (essentially the same as vector spaces over the rationals).
- The theory of the set of natural numbers with a successor function.

There are also examples of theories that are categorical in ω but not categorical in uncountable cardinals. The simplest example is the theory of an equivalence relation with exactly two equivalence classes, both of which are infinite. Another example is the theory of dense linear orders with no endpoints; Cantor proved that any such countable linear order is isomorphic to the rational numbers: see Cantor's isomorphism theorem.

== Dividing lines ==
Mathematicians working in classification theory organize first-order theories according to dividing lines. A dividing line is a property that some first-order theories have, while others do not have, such that theories having different dividing line properties have different structural behavior. The dividing lines are usually designed to make precise an intuitive sense of "how complicated the models of a complete first-order theory can be". Often, a dividing line property is defined so that possessing the property makes a theory wild, and a tame theory is a theory that does not possess any dividing line property under consideration.

For a complete theory $T$, the main dividing lines used in Shelah's categoricity theory include stability, superstability, the dimensional order property, and the omitting types order property.

A complete theory is stable in a cardinal $\kappa$ if, over each set of parameters of size $\kappa$, it has at most $\kappa$ complete types. Stability restricts the number of possible extensions of partial information over a parameter set.

A theory is superstable if it is stable in all sufficiently large cardinals; equivalently, in the countable case, it is stable in every uncountable cardinal. Superstability is a basic hypothesis in the structure theory of models of complete theories.

The dimensional order property (DOP) is a configuration in a superstable theory which permits the construction of many non-isomorphic models by varying independent dimensions over a two-dimensional arrangement of models. The presence of DOP is a sign that the theory has a complicated spectrum of models.

The omitting types order property (OTOP) is another configuration in a superstable theory which permits the coding of order-like information by controlling which types are omitted in models. Like DOP, the presence of OTOP gives rise to many non-isomorphic models in large cardinalities.

A complete first-order theory is called classifiable if it is superstable, not DOP, and not OTOP. Shelah's main structure theory can decompose classifiable models into simpler pieces. In contrast, theories with instability, unsuperstability, DOP, or OTOP have many non-isomorphic models in sufficiently large cardinalities, almost all too wild to describe.

Some other dividing lines are the tree property, the independence property, the strict order property (SOP), etc.

== Properties ==
Every categorical theory is complete. However, the converse does not hold.

Any theory T categorical in some infinite cardinal κ is very close to being complete. More precisely, the Łoś–Vaught test states that if a satisfiable theory has no finite models and is categorical in some infinite cardinal κ at least equal to the cardinality of its language, then the theory is complete. The reason is that all infinite models are first-order equivalent to some model of cardinal κ by the Löwenheim–Skolem theorem, and so are all equivalent as the theory is categorical in κ. Therefore, the theory is complete as all models are equivalent. The assumption that the theory have no finite models is necessary.

== See also ==
- Spectrum of a theory
