= Alfred Tarski =

Polish–American mathematician (1901–1983)

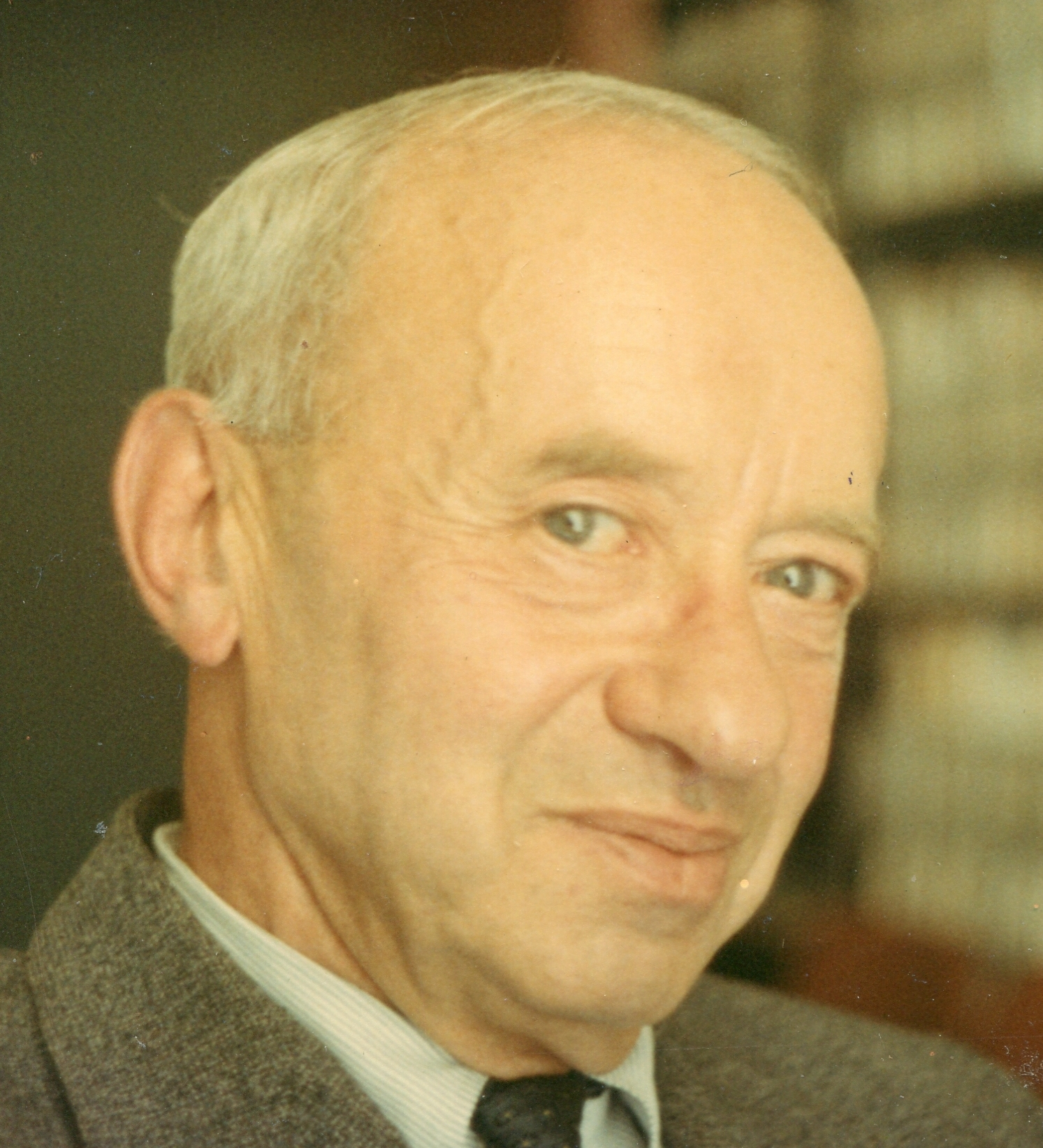
- Tarski in 1968
- Born: Alfred Teitelbaum; January 14, 1901; Warsaw, Congress Poland
- Died: October 26, 1983 (aged 82); Berkeley, California, US
- Education: University of Warsaw (Ph.D., 1924)
- Known for: Work on the foundations of modern logic; Semantic theory of truth (Convention T); Tarski's undefinability theorem; Development of model theory; Logic of relations; Banach–Tarski paradox; Tarski's fixed-point theorem; Tarski-style universes; Tarski's axioms; Tarski monster group; Tarski's circle-squaring problem; Tarski–Kuratowski algorithm; Jónsson–Tarski duality; Lindenbaum–Tarski algebra; Cylindric algebra
- Scientific career
- Fields: Mathematics, logic, formal language
- Workplaces: University of Warsaw (1925–1939); Harvard University (1939-1941); University of California, Berkeley (1942–1983)
- Thesis: O wyrazie pierwotnym logistyki (On the Primitive Term of Logistic) (1924)
- Doctoral advisor: Stanisław Leśniewski
- Doctoral students: Chen Chung Chang; Solomon Feferman; Haim Gaifman; Bjarni Jónsson; Howard Jerome Keisler; Roger Maddux; Richard Montague; Anne C. Morel; Andrzej Mostowski; Julia Robinson; Wanda Szmielew; Robert Vaught
- Other notable students: Evert Willem Beth

Alfred Tarski (/ˈtɑːrski/; Polish: [ˈtarskʲi]; born Alfred Teitelbaum; January 14, 1901 – October 26, 1983) was a Polish logician and mathematician. A prolific author best known for his work on model theory, metamathematics, and algebraic logic, he also contributed to abstract algebra, topology, geometry, measure theory, mathematical logic, set theory, type theory, and analytic philosophy.

Educated in Poland at the University of Warsaw, and a member of the Lwów–Warsaw school of logic and the Warsaw school of mathematics, in 1939 he immigrated to the United States, where in 1945 he became a naturalized citizen. Tarski taught and carried out research in mathematics at the University of California, Berkeley, from 1942 until his death in 1983.

His biographers Anita Burdman Feferman and Solomon Feferman state that, "Along with his contemporary, Kurt Gödel, he changed the face of logic in the twentieth century, especially through his work on the concept of truth and the theory of models."

== Life ==
=== Early life and education ===
Alfred Tarski was born Alfred Teitelbaum (Polish spelling: "Tajtelbaum") to Polish-Jewish parents in comfortable circumstances. He first showed mathematical ability in secondary school, at Warsaw's Szkoła Mazowiecka. Nevertheless, in 1918 he entered the University of Warsaw intending to study biology.

After Poland regained independence in 1918, Warsaw University came under the leadership of Jan Łukasiewicz, Stanisław Leśniewski, and Wacław Sierpiński and quickly became a world-leading research institution in logic, foundational mathematics, and the philosophy of mathematics. Leśniewski recognized Tarski's potential as a mathematician and encouraged him to abandon biology.

Tarski attended courses taught by Łukasiewicz, Sierpiński, Stefan Mazurkiewicz, and Tadeusz Kotarbiński and in 1924 became the only person ever to complete a doctorate under Leśniewski's supervision. His thesis, O wyrazie pierwotnym logistyki (On the Primitive Term of Logistic), was published in 1923.

Tarski and Leśniewski soon grew cool to each other, mainly due to Leśniewski's growing anti-semitism. In later life, however, Tarski expressed the warmest praise (which was reciprocated) for Kotarbiński.

In 1923, Alfred Teitelbaum and his brother Wacław changed their surname to “Tarski”. The brothers also converted to Roman Catholicism, Poland's dominant religion, even though Alfred was an avowed atheist. (Note: "Most of the Socialist Party members were also in favor of assimilation, and Tarski's political allegiance was socialist at the time. So, along with its being a practical move, becoming more Polish than Jewish was an ideological statement and was approved by many, though not all, of his colleagues. As to why Tarski, a professed atheist, converted, that just came with the territory and was part of the package: if you were going to be Polish then you had to say you were Catholic.")

=== Career ===
After becoming the youngest person ever to complete a doctorate at Warsaw University, Tarski taught logic at the Polish Pedagogical Institute, mathematics and logic at the university, and served as Łukasiewicz's assistant. Because these positions were poorly paid, from 1925 Tarski also taught mathematics at the Third Boys’ Gymnasium (secondary school) of the Trade Union of Polish Secondary-School Teachers (later the Stefan Żeromski Gymnasium). Before World War II it was not uncommon for European intellectuals of research caliber to teach secondary school. Until his departure for the United States in 1939, Tarski wrote several textbooks and many papers – a number of them ground-breaking – while supporting himself mainly by teaching secondary-school mathematics.

In 1929 Tarski married fellow teacher Maria Witkowska, a Catholic Pole who had served during the Polish–Soviet War (1919–1921) as a courier for the Polish Army. They had two children: son Jan Tarski, who became a physicist; and daughter Ina, who married mathematician Andrzej Ehrenfeucht.

Tarski applied for a chair of philosophy at Lwów University, but on Bertrand Russell's recommendation it was awarded to Leon Chwistek. In 1930 Tarski visited the University of Vienna, lectured to Karl Menger's colloquium, and met Kurt Gödel. Thanks to a fellowship, he was able to return to Vienna during the first half of 1935 to work with Menger's research group. From Vienna he traveled to Paris to present his ideas on truth at the first meeting of the Unity of Science movement, an offshoot of the Vienna Circle.

Tarski's academic career in Poland was affected by his heritage. In 1937, when he applied for a chair at Poznań University, the chair was abolished to avoid assigning it to Tarski – indisputably the strongest applicant – because he was Jewish.

Tarski's ties to the Unity of Science movement likely saved his life, because they resulted in his being invited to address the Unity of Science Congress held in September 1939 at Harvard University. He left Poland in August 1939, on the last ship to sail from Poland for the United States before the German and Soviet invasion of Poland and the outbreak of World War II. Tarski left reluctantly, because Leśniewski had died a few months before, creating a vacancy which Tarski hoped to fill. Oblivious to the Nazi threat, he left his wife and children in Warsaw, not to see them again until 1946. During the war, nearly all his Jewish extended family were murdered by the German occupiers.

In the United States, Tarski held a number of temporary teaching and research positions: at Harvard University (1939), at City College of New York (1940), and thanks to a Guggenheim Fellowship, at the Institute for Advanced Study at Princeton (1942), where he again met Gödel. In 1942 Tarski joined the mathematics department at the University of California, Berkeley, where he spent the rest of his career. In 1945 he became an American citizen. Although emeritus from 1968, he taught until 1973 and supervised Ph.D. candidates until his death. At Berkeley, Tarski acquired a reputation as an astounding and demanding teacher, as noted by many observers:

His seminars at Berkeley quickly became famous in the world of mathematical logic. His students, many of whom became distinguished mathematicians, noted the awesome energy with which he would coax and cajole their best work out of them, always demanding the highest standards of clarity and precision.

Tarski was extroverted, quick-witted, strong-willed, energetic, and sharp-tongued. He preferred his research to be collaborative — sometimes working all night with a colleague — and was very fastidious about priority.

A charismatic leader and teacher, known for his brilliantly precise yet suspenseful expository style, Tarski had intimidatingly high standards for students, but at the same time he could be very encouraging, and particularly so to women — in contrast to the general trend. Some students were frightened away, but a circle of disciples remained, many of whom became world-renowned leaders in the field.

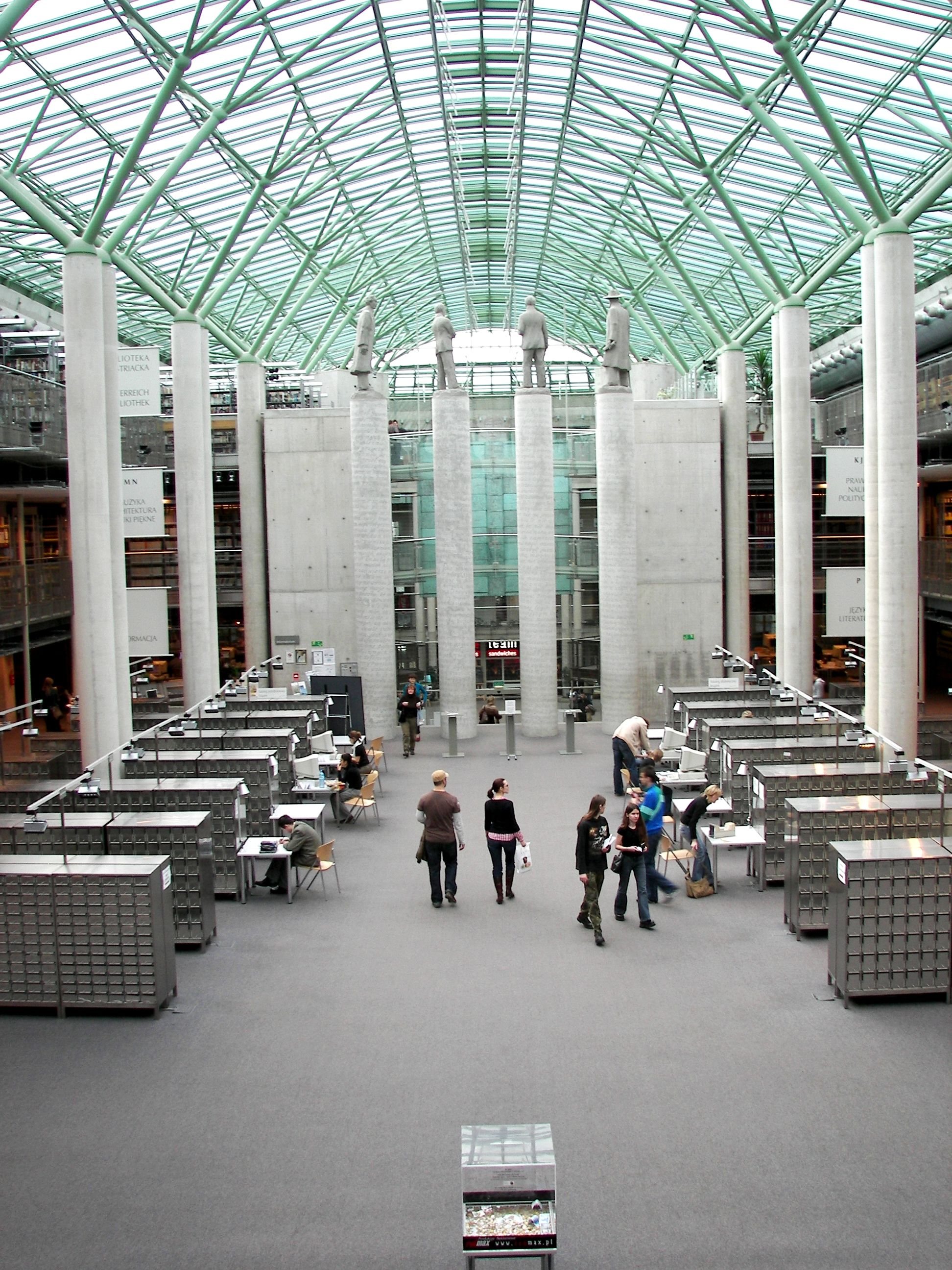
Atop four pillars at entrance to Warsaw University Library stand statues of Lwów-Warsaw School philosophers (right to left) Kazimierz Twardowski, Jan Łukasiewicz, Alfred Tarski, Stanisław Leśniewski.

Tarski supervised twenty-four Ph.D. dissertations, including those of – in chronological order – Andrzej Mostowski, Bjarni Jónsson, Julia Robinson, Robert Vaught, Solomon Feferman, Richard Montague, James Donald Monk, Haim Gaifman, Donald Pigozzi, and Roger Maddux, as well as Chen Chung Chang and Jerome Keisler, authors of Model Theory (1973), a classic in the field. He also strongly influenced the dissertations of Adolf Lindenbaum, Dana Scott, and Steven Givant.

Five of Tarski's students were women, remarkably so, given that men were then the overwhelming majority of graduate students. He had extramarital affairs with at least two of the women. After he showed the work of another female student to a male colleague, the colleague published it himself, causing the woman to break off her graduate studies and later move to a different university.

Tarski lectured at University College, London (1950, 1966), the Institut Henri Poincaré in Paris (1955), the Miller Institute for Basic Research in Science at Berkeley (1958–60), the University of California at Los Angeles (1967), and the Pontifical Catholic University of Chile (1974–75).

Among many distinctions garnered over his career, Tarski was elected to the United States National Academy of Sciences, the British Academy, and the Royal Netherlands Academy of Arts and Sciences in 1958; and received honorary degrees from the Pontifical Catholic University of Chile in 1975, from Marseille's Paul Cézanne University in 1977, and from the University of Calgary, as well as a Berkeley Citation in 1981.

Tarski presided over the Association for Symbolic Logic, 1944–46, and the International Union for the History and Philosophy of Science, 1956–57; and was an honorary editor of Algebra Universalis.

== Work in mathematics ==
Tarski's mathematical interests were exceptionally broad. His collected papers run to about 2,500 pages, most of them on mathematics, not logic. For a concise survey of Tarski's mathematical and logical accomplishments by his former student Solomon Feferman, see "Interludes I–VI" in Feferman and Feferman.

Tarski's first paper, published when he was 19 years old, was on set theory, a subject to which he returned throughout his life. In 1924, he and Stefan Banach proved that, if one accepts the Axiom of Choice, a ball can be cut into a finite number of pieces, and then reassembled into a ball of larger size, or alternatively it can be reassembled into two balls whose sizes each equal that of the original one. This result is now called the Banach–Tarski paradox.

In A decision method for elementary algebra and geometry, Tarski showed, by the method of quantifier elimination, that the first-order theory of the real numbers under addition and multiplication is decidable. (While this result appeared only in 1948, it dates back to 1930 and was mentioned in Tarski (1931).) This is a very curious result, because Alonzo Church proved in 1936 that Peano arithmetic (the theory of natural numbers) is not decidable. Peano arithmetic is also incomplete by Gödel's incompleteness theorem. In his 1953 Undecidable theories, Tarski et al. showed that many mathematical systems, including lattice theory, abstract projective geometry, and closure algebras, are all undecidable. The theory of Abelian groups is decidable, but that of non-Abelian groups is not.

While teaching at the Stefan Żeromski Gimnazjum in the 1920s and 30s, Tarski often taught geometry. Using some ideas of Mario Pieri, in 1926 Tarski devised an original axiomatization for plane Euclidean geometry, one considerably more concise than Hilbert's. Tarski's axioms form a first-order theory devoid of set theory, whose individuals are points, and having only two primitive relations. In 1930, he proved this theory decidable because it can be mapped into another theory he had already proved decidable, namely his first-order theory of the real numbers.

In 1929 he showed that much of Euclidean solid geometry could be recast as a second-order theory whose individuals are spheres (a primitive notion), a single primitive binary relation "is contained in", and two axioms that, among other things, imply that containment partially orders the spheres. Relaxing the requirement that all individuals be spheres yields a formalization of mereology far easier to exposit than Lesniewski's variant. Near the end of his life, Tarski wrote a very long letter, published as Tarski and Givant (1999), summarizing his work on geometry.

Cardinal Algebras studied algebras whose models include the arithmetic of cardinal numbers. Ordinal Algebras sets out an algebra for the additive theory of order types. Cardinal, but not ordinal, addition commutes.

In 1941, Tarski published an important paper on binary relations, which began the work on relation algebra and its metamathematics that occupied Tarski and his students for much of the balance of his life. While that exploration (and the closely related work of Roger Lyndon) uncovered some important limitations of relation algebra, Tarski also showed (Tarski and Givant 1987) that relation algebra can express most axiomatic set theory and Peano arithmetic. For an introduction to relation algebra, see Maddux (2006). In the late 1940s, Tarski and his students devised cylindric algebras, which are to first-order logic what the two-element Boolean algebra is to classical sentential logic. This work culminated in the two monographs by Tarski, Henkin, and Monk (1971, 1985).

== Work in logic ==
Tarski's student, Robert Lawson Vaught, has ranked Tarski as one of the four greatest logicians of all time — along with Aristotle, Gottlob Frege, and Kurt Gödel. However, Tarski often expressed great admiration for Charles Sanders Peirce, particularly for his pioneering work in the logic of relations.

Tarski produced axioms for logical consequence and worked on deductive systems, the algebra of logic, and the theory of definability. His semantic methods, which culminated in the model theory he and a number of his Berkeley students developed in the 1950s and 60s, radically transformed Hilbert's proof-theoretic metamathematics. Around 1930, Tarski developed an abstract theory of logical deductions that models some properties of logical calculi. Mathematically, what he described is just a finitary closure operator on a set (the set of sentences). In abstract algebraic logic, finitary closure operators are still studied under the name consequence operator, which was coined by Tarski. The set S represents a set of sentences, a subset T of S a theory, and cl(T) is the set of all sentences that follow from the theory. This abstract approach was applied to fuzzy logic (see Gerla 2000).

In [Tarski's] view, metamathematics became similar to any mathematical discipline. Not only can its concepts and results be mathematized, but they actually can be integrated into mathematics. ... Tarski destroyed the borderline between metamathematics and mathematics. He objected to restricting the role of metamathematics to the foundations of mathematics.

Tarski's 1936 article "On the concept of logical consequence" argued that the conclusion of an argument will follow logically from its premises if and only if every model of the premises is a model of the conclusion. In 1937, he published a paper presenting clearly his views on the nature and purpose of the deductive method, and the role of logic in scientific studies. His high school and undergraduate teaching on logic and axiomatics culminated in a classic short text, published first in Polish, then in German translation, and finally in a 1941 English translation as Introduction to Logic and to the Methodology of Deductive Sciences.

Tarski's 1969 "Truth and proof" considered both Gödel's incompleteness theorems and Tarski's undefinability theorem, and mulled over their consequences for the axiomatic method in mathematics.

=== Truth in formalized languages ===
In 1933, Tarski published a very long paper in Polish, titled "Pojęcie prawdy w językach nauk dedukcyjnych", "Setting out a mathematical definition of truth for formal languages." The 1935 German translation was titled "Der Wahrheitsbegriff in den formalisierten Sprachen", "The concept of truth in formalized languages", sometimes shortened to "Wahrheitsbegriff". An English translation appeared in the 1956 first edition of the volume Logic, Semantics, Metamathematics. This collection of papers from 1923 to 1938 is an event in 20th-century analytic philosophy, a contribution to symbolic logic, semantics, and the philosophy of language. For a brief discussion of its content, see Convention T (and also T-schema).

A philosophical debate examines the extent to which Tarski's theory of truth for formalized languages can be seen as a correspondence theory of truth. The debate centers on how to read Tarski's condition of material adequacy for a true definition. That condition requires that the truth theory have the following as theorems for all sentences p of the language for which truth is being defined:

"p" is true if and only if p.

(where p is the proposition expressed by "p")

The debate amounts to whether to read sentences of this form, such as

"Snow is white" is true if and only if snow is white

as expressing merely a deflationary theory of truth or as embodying truth as a more substantial property (see Kirkham 1992).

=== Logical consequence ===
In 1936, Tarski published Polish and German versions of a lecture, “On the Concept of Following Logically", he had given the preceding year at the International Congress of Scientific Philosophy in Paris. A new English translation of this paper, Tarski (2002), highlights the many differences between the German and Polish versions of the paper and corrects a number of mistranslations in Tarski (1983).

This publication set out the modern model-theoretic definition of (semantic) logical consequence, or at least the basis for it. Whether Tarski's notion was entirely the modern one turns on whether he intended to admit models with varying domains (and in particular, models with domains of different cardinalities). This question is a matter of some debate in the philosophical literature. John Etchemendy stimulated much of the discussion about Tarski's treatment of varying domains.

Tarski ends by pointing out that his definition of logical consequence depends upon a division of terms into the logical and the extra-logical and he expresses some skepticism that any such objective division will be forthcoming. "What are Logical Notions?" can thus be viewed as continuing "On the Concept of Logical Consequence".

=== Logical notions ===
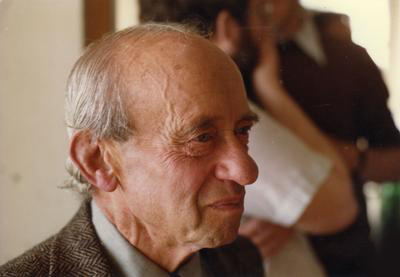
Alfred Tarski at Berkeley

Tarski's "What are Logical Notions?" (Tarski 1986) is the published version of a talk that he gave originally in 1966 in London and later in 1973 in Buffalo; it was edited without his direct involvement by John Corcoran. It became the most cited paper in the journal History and Philosophy of Logic.

In the talk, Tarski proposed demarcation of logical operations (which he calls "notions") from non-logical. The suggested criteria were derived from the Erlangen program of the 19th-century German mathematician Felix Klein. Mautner (in 1946), and possibly an article by the Portuguese mathematician José Sebastião e Silva, anticipated Tarski in applying the Erlangen Program to logic.

The Erlangen program classified the various types of geometry (Euclidean geometry, affine geometry, topology, etc.) by the type of one-one transformation of space onto itself that left the objects of that geometrical theory invariant. (A one-to-one transformation is a functional map of the space onto itself so that every point of the space is associated with or mapped to one other point of the space. So, "rotate 30 degrees" and "magnify by a factor of 2" are intuitive descriptions of simple uniform one-one transformations.) Continuous transformations give rise to the objects of topology, similarity transformations to those of Euclidean geometry, and so on.

As the range of permissible transformations becomes broader, the range of objects one is able to distinguish as preserved by the application of the transformations becomes narrower. Similarity transformations are fairly narrow (they preserve the relative distance between points) and thus allow us to distinguish relatively many things (e.g., equilateral triangles from non-equilateral triangles). Continuous transformations (which can intuitively be thought of as transformations which allow non-uniform stretching, compression, bending, and twisting, but no ripping or glueing) allow us to distinguish a polygon from an annulus (ring with a hole in the centre), but do not allow us to distinguish two polygons from each other.

Tarski's proposal was to demarcate the logical notions by considering all possible one-to-one transformations (automorphisms) of a domain onto itself. By domain is meant the universe of discourse of a model for the semantic theory of logic. If one identifies the truth value True with the domain set and the truth-value False with the empty set, then the following operations are counted as logical under the proposal:

1. Truth-functions: All truth-functions are admitted by the proposal. This includes, but is not limited to, all n-ary truth-functions for finite n. (It also admits of truth-functions with any infinite number of places.)
2. Individuals: No individuals, provided the domain has at least two members.
3. Predicates:
  - the one-place total and null predicates, the former having all members of the domain in its extension and the latter having no members of the domain in its extension
  - two-place total and null predicates, the former having the set of all ordered pairs of domain members as its extension and the latter with the empty set as extension
  - the two-place identity predicate, with the set of all order-pairs <a,a> in its extension, where a is a member of the domain
  - the two-place diversity predicate, with the set of all order pairs <a,b> where a and b are distinct members of the domain
  - n-ary predicates in general: all predicates definable from the identity predicate together with conjunction, disjunction and negation (up to any ordinality, finite or infinite)
4. Quantifiers: Tarski explicitly discusses only monadic quantifiers and points out that all such numerical quantifiers are admitted under his proposal. These include the standard universal and existential quantifiers as well as numerical quantifiers such as "Exactly four", "Finitely many", "Uncountably many", and "Between four and 9 million", for example. While Tarski does not enter into the issue, it is also clear that polyadic quantifiers are admitted under the proposal. These are quantifiers like, given two predicates Fx and Gy, "More(x, y)", which says "More things have F than have G."
5. Set-Theoretic relations: Relations such as inclusion, intersection and union applied to subsets of the domain are logical in the present sense.
6. Set membership: Tarski ended his lecture with a discussion of whether the set membership relation counted as logical in his sense. (Given the reduction of (most of) mathematics to set theory, this was, in effect, the question of whether most or all of mathematics is a part of logic.) He pointed out that set membership is logical if set theory is developed along the lines of type theory, but is extralogical if set theory is set out axiomatically, as in the canonical Zermelo–Fraenkel set theory.
7. Logical notions of higher order: While Tarski confined his discussion to operations of first-order logic, there is nothing about his proposal that necessarily restricts it to first-order logic. (Tarski likely restricted his attention to first-order notions as the talk was given to a non-technical audience.) So, higher-order quantifiers and predicates are admitted as well.

In some ways the present proposal is the obverse of that of Lindenbaum and Tarski (1936), who proved that all the logical operations of Bertrand Russell's and Whitehead's Principia Mathematica are invariant under one-to-one transformations of the domain onto itself. The present proposal is also employed in Tarski and Givant (1987).

Solomon Feferman and Vann McGee further discussed Tarski's proposal in work published after his death. Feferman (1999) raises problems for the proposal and suggests a cure: replacing Tarski's preservation by automorphisms with preservation by arbitrary homomorphisms. In essence, this suggestion circumvents the difficulty Tarski's proposal has in dealing with a sameness of logical operation across distinct domains of a given cardinality and across domains of distinct cardinalities. Feferman's proposal results in a radical restriction of logical terms as compared to Tarski's original proposal. In particular, it ends up counting as logical only those operators of standard first-order logic without identity.

Vann McGee (1996) provides a precise account of what operations are logical in the sense of Tarski's proposal in terms of expressibility in a language that extends first-order logic by allowing arbitrarily long conjunctions and disjunctions, and quantification over arbitrarily many variables. "Arbitrarily" includes a countable infinity.

== Selected publications ==
Anthologies and collections

- 1986. The Collected Papers of Alfred Tarski, 4 vols. Givant, S. R., and McKenzie, R. N., eds. Birkhäuser.
- Givant Steven (1986). "Bibliography of Alfred Tarski". Journal of Symbolic Logic. 51 (4): 913–41. doi:10.2307/2273905. JSTOR 2273905. S2CID 44369365.
- 1983 (1956). Logic, Semantics, Metamathematics: Papers from 1923 to 1938 by Alfred Tarski, Corcoran, J., ed. Hackett. 1st edition edited and translated by J. H. Woodger, Oxford Uni. Press. This collection contains translations from Polish of some of Tarski's most important papers of his early career, including The Concept of Truth in Formalized Languages and On the Concept of Logical Consequence discussed above.

Original publications of Tarski

- 1930 Une contribution à la théorie de la mesure. Fund Math 15 (1930), 42–50.
- 1930. (with Jan Łukasiewicz). "Untersuchungen uber den Aussagenkalkul" ["Investigations into the Sentential Calculus"], Comptes Rendus des seances de la Societe des Sciences et des Lettres de Varsovie, Vol, 23 (1930) Cl. III, pp. 31–32 in Tarski (1983): 38–59.
- 1931. "Sur les ensembles définissables de nombres réels I", Fundamenta Mathematicae 17: 210–239 in Tarski (1983): 110–142.
- 1936. "Grundlegung der wissenschaftlichen Semantik", Actes du Congrès international de philosophie scientifique, Sorbonne, Paris 1935, vol. III, Language et pseudo-problèmes, Paris, Hermann, 1936, pp. 1–8 in Tarski (1983): 401–408.
- 1936. "Über den Begriff der logischen Folgerung", Actes du Congrès international de philosophie scientifique, Sorbonne, Paris 1935, vol. VII, Logique, Paris: Hermann, pp. 1–11 in Tarski (1983): 409–420.
- 1936 (with Adolf Lindenbaum). "On the Limitations of Deductive Theories" in Tarski (1983): 384–92.
- 1937. Einführung in die Mathematische Logik und in die Methodologie der Mathematik. Springer, Wien (Vienna).
- 1994 (1941). Introduction to Logic and to the Methodology of Deductive Sciences. Dover.
- 1941. "On the calculus of relations", Journal of Symbolic Logic 6: 73–89.
- 1944. "The Semantic Conception of Truth and the Foundations of Semantics," Philosophy and Phenomenological Research 4: 341–75.
- 1948. A decision method for elementary algebra and geometry. Santa Monica CA: RAND Corp.
- 1949. Cardinal Algebras. Oxford Univ. Press.
- 1953 (with Mostowski and Raphael Robinson). Undecidable theories. North Holland.
- 1956. Ordinal algebras. North-Holland.
- 1965. "A simplified formalization of predicate logic with identity", Archiv für Mathematische Logik und Grundlagenforschung 7: 61–79
- 1969. "Truth and Proof", Scientific American 220: 63–77.
- 1971 (with Leon Henkin and Donald Monk). Cylindric Algebras: Part I. North-Holland.
- 1985 (with Leon Henkin and Donald Monk). Cylindric Algebras: Part II. North-Holland.
- 1986. "What are Logical Notions?", Corcoran, J., ed., History and Philosophy of Logic 7: 143–54.
- 1987 (with Steven Givant). A Formalization of Set Theory Without Variables. Vol.41 of American Mathematical Society colloquium publications. Providence RI: American Mathematical Society. ISBN 978-0821810415. Review
- 1999 (with Steven Givant). "Tarski's system of geometry", Bulletin of Symbolic Logic 5: 175–214.
- 2002. "On the Concept of Following Logically" (Magda Stroińska and David Hitchcock, trans.) History and Philosophy of Logic 23: 155–196.

== See also ==
- Cylindric algebra
- History of philosophy in Poland
- Interpretability
- List of things named after Alfred Tarski
- Timeline of Polish science and technology
- Weak interpretability

== Sources ==
Biographical references

- Feferman, Anita Burdman (1999). "Alfred Tarski". American National Biography. Vol. 21. Oxford University Press. pp. 330–332. ISBN 978-0-19-512800-0.
- Feferman, Anita Burdman; Feferman, Solomon (2004). Alfred Tarski: Life and Logic. Cambridge University Press. ISBN 978-0-521-80240-6. OCLC 54691904.
- Frost-Arnold, Greg (2013). Carnap, Tarski, and Quine at Harvard: Conversations on Logic, Mathematics, and Science. Chicago: Open Court. ISBN 9780812698374.
- Givant Steven (1991). "A portrait of Alfred Tarski". Mathematical Intelligencer. 13 (3): 16–32. doi:10.1007/bf03023831. S2CID 122867668.
- Patterson, Douglas. Alfred Tarski: Philosophy of Language and Logic (Palgrave Macmillan; 2012) 262 pages; biography focused on his work from the late-1920s to the mid-1930s, with particular attention to influences from his teachers Stanislaw Lesniewski and Tadeusz Kotarbinski.

Logic literature

- The December 1986 issue of the Journal of Symbolic Logic surveys Tarski's work on model theory (Robert Vaught), algebra (Jonsson), undecidable theories (McNulty), algebraic logic (Donald Monk), and geometry (Szczerba). The March 1988 issue of the same journal surveys his work on axiomatic set theory (Azriel Levy), real closed fields (Lou Van Den Dries), decidable theory (Doner and Wilfrid Hodges), metamathematics (Blok and Pigozzi), truth and logical consequence (John Etchemendy), and general philosophy (Patrick Suppes).
  - Blok, W. J.; Pigozzi, Don, "Alfred Tarski's Work on General Metamathematics", The Journal of Symbolic Logic, Vol. 53, No. 1 (Mar., 1988), pp. 36–50
- Chang, C.C., and Keisler, H.J., 1973. Model Theory. North-Holland, Amsterdam. American Elsevier, New York.
- Corcoran, John, and Sagüillo, José Miguel, 2011. "The Absence of Multiple Universes of Discourse in the 1936 Tarski Consequence-Definition Paper", History and Philosophy of Logic 32: 359–80.
- Corcoran, John, and Weber, Leonardo, 2015. "Tarski's convention T: condition beta", South American Journal of Logic. 1, 3–32.
- Etchemendy, John, 1999. The Concept of Logical Consequence. Stanford CA: CSLI Publications. ISBN 1-57586-194-1
- Feferman Solomon (1999). "Logic, Logics, and Logicism" (PDF). Notre Dame Journal of Formal Logic. 40: 31–54. doi:10.1305/ndjfl/1039096304.
- Gerla, G. (2000) Fuzzy Logic: Mathematical Tools for Approximate Reasoning. Kluwer Academic Publishers.
- Grattan-Guinness, Ivor, 2000. The Search for Mathematical Roots 1870-1940. Princeton Uni. Press.
- Kirkham, Richard, 1992. Theories of Truth. MIT Press.
- Maddux, Roger D., 2006. Relation Algebras, vol. 150 in "Studies in Logic and the Foundations of Mathematics", Elsevier Science.
- Mautner F. I. (1946). "An Extension of Klein's Erlanger Program: Logic as Invariant-Theory". American Journal of Mathematics. 68 (3): 345–84. doi:10.2307/2371821. JSTOR 2371821.
- McGee Van (1996). "Logical Operations". Journal of Philosophical Logic. 25 (6): 567–80. doi:10.1007/bf00265253. S2CID 32381037.
- Popper, Karl R., 1972, Rev. Ed. 1979, "Philosophical Comments on Tarski's Theory of Truth", with Addendum, Objective Knowledge, Oxford: 319–340.
- Sinaceur H (2001). "Alfred Tarski: Semantic shift, heuristic shift in metamathematics". Synthese. 126 (1–2): 49–65. doi:10.1023/a:1005268531418. S2CID 28783841.
- Smith, James T., 2010. "Definitions and Nondefinability in Geometry", American Mathematical Monthly 117:475–89.
- Wolenski, Jan, 1989. Logic and Philosophy in the Lvov–Warsaw School. Reidel/Kluwer.
