= Complete theory =

Concept in mathematical logic

In mathematical logic, a theory of a language is complete if it is consistent and it proves every closed formula with which it is not inconsistent. That is to say, a consistent theory $T$ is complete if, for every sentence $\varphi$ in the language, either $T \vdash \varphi$ holds or $T \cup \{\varphi\}$ is inconsistent. Another common definition, that is equivalent if the formal system satisfies the principle of explosion, requires instead that either $\varphi$ or its negation $\neg \varphi$ is provable from $T$. Using this definition, consistency of $T$ follows automatically if "either" and "or" are read as exclusive disjunction, and it thus can be omitted from the definition. If $T$ is furthermore deductively closed, completeness reduces to the concise condition that exactly one of $\varphi$ and $\neg \varphi$ is contained in $T$ for every sentence $\varphi$. Recursively axiomatizable first-order theories that are consistent and rich enough to allow general mathematical reasoning to be formulated cannot be complete, as demonstrated by Gödel's first incompleteness theorem.

This syntactic sense of complete is distinct from the semantic notion of a complete formal system, which asserts that for every theory that can be formulated in the formal system, all semantically valid statements are provable theorems (for an appropriate sense of "semantically valid"). Gödel's completeness theorem is about this latter kind of completeness.

== Complete theories ==
Complete theories are closed under a number of conditions internally modelling the T-schema:

- For a set of formulas $S$: $A \land B \in S$ if and only if $A \in S$ and $B \in S$,
- For a set of formulas $S$: $A \lor B \in S$ if and only if $A \in S$ or $B \in S$.

Maximal consistent sets are a fundamental tool in the model theory of classical logic and modal logic. Their existence in a given case is usually a straightforward consequence of Zorn's lemma, based on the idea that a contradiction involves use of only finitely many premises. In the case of modal logics, the collection of maximal consistent sets extending a theory T (closed under the necessitation rule) can be given the structure of a model of T, called the canonical model.

== Examples ==
Some examples of complete theories are:

- Presburger arithmetic
- Tarski's axioms for Euclidean geometry
- The theory of dense linear orders without endpoints
- The theory of algebraically closed fields of a given characteristic
- The theory of real closed fields
- Every uncountably categorical countable theory
- Every countably categorical countable theory
- A group of three elements
- True arithmetic or any other elementary diagram or complete theory of a structure (see Theory (mathematical logic) § Theories associated with a structure)

== See also ==
- Lindenbaum's lemma
- Łoś–Vaught test
