= Real algebraic geometry =

Study of systems of inequalitites

In mathematics, real algebraic geometry is the sub-branch of algebraic geometry studying real algebraic sets, i.e. real-number solutions to algebraic equations with real-number coefficients, and mappings between them (in particular real polynomial mappings).

Semialgebraic geometry is the study of semialgebraic sets, i.e. real-number solutions to algebraic inequalities with-real number coefficients, and mappings between them. The most natural mappings between semialgebraic sets are semialgebraic mappings, i.e., mappings whose graphs are semialgebraic sets.

== Terminology ==
Nowadays the words 'semialgebraic geometry' and 'real algebraic geometry' are used as synonyms, because real algebraic sets cannot be studied seriously without the use of semialgebraic sets. For example, a projection of a real algebraic set along a coordinate axis need not be a real algebraic set, but it is always a semialgebraic set: this is the Tarski–Seidenberg theorem. Related fields are o-minimal theory and real analytic geometry.

Examples: Real plane curves are examples of real algebraic sets and polyhedra are examples of semialgebraic sets. Real algebraic functions and Nash functions are examples of semialgebraic mappings. Piecewise polynomial mappings (see the Pierce–Birkhoff conjecture) are also semialgebraic mappings.

Computational real algebraic geometry is concerned with the algorithmic aspects of real algebraic (and semialgebraic) geometry. The main algorithm is cylindrical algebraic decomposition. It is used to cut semialgebraic sets into nice pieces and to compute their projections.

Real algebra is the part of algebra which is relevant to real algebraic (and semialgebraic) geometry. It is mostly concerned with the study of ordered fields and ordered rings (in particular real closed fields) and their applications to the study of positive polynomials and sums-of-squares of polynomials. (See Hilbert's 17th problem and the Krivine-Stengle Positivstellensatz.) The relation of real algebra to real algebraic geometry is similar to the relation of commutative algebra to complex algebraic geometry. Related fields are the theory of moment problems, convex optimization, the theory of quadratic forms, valuation theory and model theory.

== Timeline of real algebra and real algebraic geometry ==
- 1826 Fourier's algorithm for systems of linear inequalities. Rediscovered by Lloyd Dines in 1919 and Theodore Motzkin in 1936.
- 1835 Sturm's theorem on real root counting
- 1856 Hermite's theorem on real root counting.
- 1876 Harnack's curve theorem. (This bound on the number of components was later extended to all Betti numbers of all real algebraic sets and all semialgebraic sets.)
- 1888 Hilbert's theorem on ternary quartics.
- 1900 Hilbert's problems (especially the 16th and the 17th problem)
- 1902 Farkas' lemma (Can be reformulated as linear positivstellensatz.)
- 1914 Annibale Comessatti showed that not every real algebraic surface is birational to RP^{2}
- 1916 Fejér's conjecture about nonnegative trigonometric polynomials. (Solved by Frigyes Riesz.)
- 1927 Emil Artin's solution of Hilbert's 17th problem
- 1927 Krull–Baer Theorem (connection between orderings and valuations)
- 1928 Pólya's Theorem on positive polynomials on a simplex
- 1929 B. L. van der Waerden sketches a proof that real algebraic and semialgebraic sets are triangularizable, but the necessary tools have not been developed to make the argument rigorous.
- 1931 Alfred Tarski's real quantifier elimination. Improved and popularized by Abraham Seidenberg in 1954. (Both use Sturm's theorem.)
- 1936 Herbert Seifert proved that every closed smooth submanifold of $\R^n$ with trivial normal bundle, can be isotoped to a component of a nonsingular real algebraic subset of $\R^n$ which is a complete intersection (from the conclusion of this theorem the word "component" can not be removed).
- 1940 Marshall Stone's representation theorem for partially ordered rings. Improved by Richard Kadison in 1951 and Donald Dubois in 1967 (Kadison–Dubois representation theorem). Further improved by Mihai Putinar in 1993 and Jacobi in 2001 (Putinar–Jacobi representation theorem).
- 1952 John Nash proved that every closed smooth manifold is diffeomorphic to a nonsingular component of a real algebraic set.
- 1956 Pierce–Birkhoff conjecture formulated. (Solved in dimensions ≤ 2.)
- 1964 Krivine's Nullstellensatz and Positivestellensatz. Rediscovered and popularized by Stengle in 1974. (Krivine uses real quantifier elimination while Stengle uses Lang's homomorphism theorem.)
- 1964 Lojasiewicz triangulated semi-analytic sets
- 1964 Heisuke Hironaka proved the resolution of singularity theorem
- 1964 Hassler Whitney proved that every analytic variety admits a stratification satisfying the Whitney conditions.
- 1967 Theodore Motzkin finds a positive polynomial which is not a sum of squares of polynomials.
- 1972 Vladimir Rokhlin proved Gudkov's conjecture.
- 1973 Alberto Tognoli proved that every closed smooth manifold is diffeomorphic to a nonsingular real algebraic set.
- 1975 George E. Collins discovers cylindrical algebraic decomposition algorithm, which improves Tarski's real quantifier elimination and allows to implement it on a computer.
- 1973 Jean-Louis Verdier proved that every subanalytic set admits a stratification with condition (w).
- 1979 Michel Coste and Marie-Françoise Roy discover the real spectrum of a commutative ring.
- 1980 Oleg Viro introduced the "patch working" technique and used it to classify real algebraic curves of low degree. Later Ilya Itenberg and Viro used it to produce counterexamples to the Ragsdale conjecture, and Grigory Mikhalkin applied it to tropical geometry for curve counting.
- 1980 Selman Akbulut and Henry C. King gave a topological characterization of real algebraic sets with isolated singularities, and topologically characterized nonsingular real algebraic sets (not necessarily compact)
- 1980 Akbulut and King proved that every knot in $S^n$ is the link of a real algebraic set with isolated singularity in $\R^{n+1}$
- 1981 Akbulut and King proved that every compact PL manifold is PL homeomorphic to a real algebraic set.
- 1983 Akbulut and King introduced "Topological Resolution Towers" as topological models of real algebraic sets, from this they obtained new topological invariants of real algebraic sets, and topologically characterized all 3-dimensional algebraic sets. These invariants later generalized by Michel Coste and Krzysztof Kurdyka as well as Clint McCrory and Adam Parusiński.
- 1984 Ludwig Bröcker's theorem on minimal generation of basic open semialgebraic sets (improved and extended to basic closed semialgebraic sets by Scheiderer.)
- 1984 Benedetti and Dedo proved that not every closed smooth manifold is diffeomorphic to a totally algebraic nonsingular real algebraic set (totally algebraic means all its Z/2Z-homology cycles are represented by real algebraic subsets).
- 1991 Akbulut and King proved that every closed smooth manifold is homeomorphic to a totally algebraic real algebraic set.
- 1991 Schmüdgen's solution of the multidimensional moment problem for compact semialgebraic sets and related strict positivstellensatz. Algebraic proof found by Wörmann. Implies Reznick's version of Artin's theorem with uniform denominators.
- 1992 Akbulut and King proved ambient versions of the Nash-Tognoli theorem: Every closed smooth submanifold of R^{n} is isotopic to the nonsingular points (component) of a real algebraic subset of R^{n}, and they extended this result to immersed submanifolds of R^{n}.
- 1992 Benedetti and Marin proved that every compact closed smooth 3-manifold M can be obtained from $S^3$ by a sequence of blow ups and downs along smooth centers, and that M is homeomorphic to a possibly singular affine real algebraic rational threefold
- 1997 Bierstone and Milman proved a canonical resolution of singularities theorem
- 1997 Mikhalkin proved that every closed smooth n-manifold can be obtained from $S^n$ by a sequence of topological blow ups and downs
- 1998 János Kollár showed that not every closed 3-manifold is a projective real 3-fold which is birational to RP^{3}
- 2000 Scheiderer's local-global principle and related non-strict extension of Schmüdgen's positivstellensatz in dimensions ≤ 2.
- 2000 János Kollár proved that every closed smooth 3–manifold is the real part of a compact complex manifold which can be obtained from $\mathbb{CP}^3$ by a sequence of real blow ups and blow downs.
- 2003 Welschinger introduces an invariant for counting real rational curves
- 2005 Akbulut and King showed that not every nonsingular real algebraic subset of RP^{n} is smoothly isotopic to the real part of a nonsingular complex algebraic subset of CP^{n}
