= Decidability of first-order theories of the real numbers =

In mathematical logic, a first-order language of the real numbers is the set of all well-formed sentences of first-order logic that involve universal and existential quantifiers and logical combinations of equalities and inequalities of expressions over real variables. The corresponding first-order theory is the set of sentences that are actually true of the real numbers. There are several different such theories, with different expressive power, depending on the primitive operations that are allowed to be used in the expression. A fundamental question in the study of these theories is whether they are decidable: that is, whether there is an algorithm that can take a sentence as input and produce as output an answer "yes" or "no" to the question of whether the sentence is true in the theory.

The theory of real closed fields is the theory in which the primitive operations are multiplication and addition; this implies that, in this theory, the only numbers that can be defined are the real algebraic numbers. As proven by Tarski, this theory is decidable; see Tarski–Seidenberg theorem and Quantifier elimination. Current implementations of decision procedures for the theory of real closed fields are often based on quantifier elimination by cylindrical algebraic decomposition.

Tarski's decidable algorithm was implemented on electronic computers in the 1950s. Its runtime is too slow for it to reach any interesting results.

Tarski's exponential function problem concerns the extension of this theory to another primitive operation, the exponential function. It is an open problem whether this theory is decidable, but if Schanuel's conjecture holds then the decidability of this theory would follow. In contrast, the extension of the theory of real closed fields with the sine function is undecidable since this allows encoding of the undecidable theory of integers (see Richardson's theorem).

Still, one can handle the undecidable case with functions such as sine by using algorithms that do not necessarily terminate always. In particular, one can design algorithms that are only required to terminate for input formulas that are robust, that is, formulas whose satisfiability does not change if the formula is slightly perturbed. Alternatively, it is also possible to use purely heuristic approaches.

== See also ==
- Construction of the real numbers
- Tarski's axiomatization of the reals – Second-order theory of the real numbers
