= Nash function =

In real algebraic geometry, a Nash function on an open semialgebraic subset U ⊂ R^{n} is an analytic function f: U → R satisfying a nontrivial polynomial equation P(x,f(x)) = 0 for all x in U (A semialgebraic subset of R^{n} is a subset obtained from subsets of the form {x in R^{n} : P(x)=0} or {x in R^{n} : P(x) > 0}, where P is a polynomial, by taking finite unions, finite intersections and complements). Some examples of Nash functions:

- Polynomial and regular rational functions are Nash functions.
- $x\mapsto \sqrt{1+x^2}$ is Nash on R.
- the function which associates to a real symmetric matrix its i-th eigenvalue (in increasing order) is Nash on the open subset of symmetric matrices with no multiple eigenvalue.

Nash functions are those functions needed in order to have an implicit function theorem in real algebraic geometry.

== Nash manifolds ==
Along with Nash functions one defines Nash manifolds, which are semialgebraic analytic submanifolds of some R^{n}. A Nash mapping between Nash manifolds is then an analytic mapping with semialgebraic graph. Nash functions and manifolds are named after John Forbes Nash, Jr., who proved (1952) that any compact smooth manifold admits a Nash manifold structure, i.e., is diffeomorphic to some Nash manifold. More generally, a smooth manifold admits a Nash manifold structure if and only if it is diffeomorphic to the interior of some compact smooth manifold possibly with boundary. Nash's result was later (1973) completed by Alberto Tognoli who proved that any compact smooth manifold is diffeomorphic to some affine real algebraic manifold; actually, any Nash manifold is Nash diffeomorphic to an affine real algebraic manifold. These results exemplify the fact that the Nash category is somewhat intermediate between the smooth and the algebraic categories.

== Local properties ==
The local properties of Nash functions are well understood. The ring of germs of Nash functions at a point of a Nash manifold of dimension n is isomorphic to the ring of algebraic power series in n variables (i.e., those series satisfying a nontrivial polynomial equation), which is the henselization of the ring of germs of rational functions. In particular, it is a regular local ring of dimension n.

== Global properties ==
The global properties are more difficult to obtain. The fact that the ring of Nash functions on a Nash manifold (even noncompact) is noetherian was proved independently (1973) by Jean-Jacques Risler and Gustave Efroymson. Nash manifolds have properties similar to but weaker than Cartan's theorems A and B on Stein manifolds. Let $\mathcal{N}$ denote the sheaf of Nash function germs on a Nash manifold M, and $\mathcal{I}$ be a coherent sheaf of $\mathcal{N}$-ideals. Assume $\mathcal{I}$ is finite, i.e., there exists a finite open semialgebraic covering $\{U_i\}$ of M such that, for each i, $\mathcal{I}|_{U_i}$ is generated by Nash functions on $U_i$. Then $\mathcal{I}$ is globally generated by Nash functions on M, and the natural map

$$H^0(M,\mathcal{N}) \to H^0(M,\mathcal{N}/\mathcal{I})$$

is surjective. However

$$H^1(M,\mathcal{N})\neq 0, \ \text{if} \ \dim(M) > 0,$$

contrarily to the case of Stein manifolds.

== Generalizations ==
Nash functions and manifolds can be defined over any real closed field instead of the field of real numbers, and the above statements still hold. Abstract Nash functions can also be defined on the real spectrum of any commutative ring.

== Sources ==
1. J. Bochnak, M. Coste and M-F. Roy: Real algebraic geometry. Springer, 1998.
2. M. Coste, J.M. Ruiz and M. Shiota: Global problems on Nash functions. Revista Matemática Complutense 17 (2004), 83--115.
3. G. Efroymson: A Nullstellensatz for Nash rings. Pacific J. Math. 54 (1974), 101--112.
4. J.F. Nash : Real algebraic manifolds. Annals of Mathematics 56 (1952), 405--421.
5. J-J. Risler: Sur l'anneau des fonctions de Nash globales. C. R. Acad. Sci. Paris Sér. A-B 276 (1973), A1513--A1516.
6. M. Shiota: Nash manifolds. Springer, 1987.
7. A. Tognoli: Su una congettura di Nash. Ann. Scuola Norm. Sup. Pisa 27 (1973), 167--185.
