= Semialgebraic space =

Mathematical space

In mathematics, especially in real algebraic geometry, a semialgebraic space is a space which is locally isomorphic to a semialgebraic set.

== Definition ==
Let U be an open subset of R^{n} for some n. A semialgebraic function on U is defined to be a continuous real-valued function on U whose restriction to any semialgebraic set contained in U has a graph which is a semialgebraic subset of the product space R^{n}×R. This endows R^{n} with a sheaf $\mathcal{O}_{\mathbf{R}^n}$ of semialgebraic functions.

(For example, any polynomial mapping between semialgebraic sets is a semialgebraic function, as is the maximum of two semialgebraic functions.)

A semialgebraic space is a locally ringed space $(X, \mathcal{O}_X)$ which is locally isomorphic to R^{n} with its sheaf of semialgebraic functions.

== See also ==
- Real closed ring
