= Pierce–Birkhoff conjecture =

Conjecture in abstract algebra about piecewise polynomial functions

In abstract algebra, the Pierce–Birkhoff conjecture asserts that any piecewise-polynomial function can be expressed as a maximum of finite minima of finite collections of polynomials. It was first stated, albeit in non-rigorous and vague wording, in the 1956 paper of Garrett Birkhoff and Richard S. Pierce in which they first introduced f-rings. The modern, rigorous statement of the conjecture was formulated by Melvin Henriksen and John R. Isbell, who worked on the problem in the early 1960s in connection with their work on f-rings. Their formulation is as follows:

For every real piecewise-polynomial function $f \colon \R^n \rightarrow \R$, there exists a finite set of polynomials $g_{ij} \in \R[x_1, \ldots, x_n]$ such that $f = \sup_i \inf_j ( g_{ij} )$.

Isbell is likely the source of the name Pierce–Birkhoff conjecture, and popularized the problem in the 1980s by discussing it with several mathematicians interested in real algebraic geometry.

The conjecture was proved true for n = 1 and 2 by Louis Mahé.

== Local Pierce–Birkhoff conjecture ==
In 1989, James J. Madden provided an equivalent statement that is in terms of the real spectrum of $A = R[x_1, \ldots, x_n]$ and the novel concepts of local polynomial representatives and separating ideals.

Denoting the real spectrum of A by $\operatorname{Sper} A$, the separating ideal of α and β in $\operatorname{Sper} A$ is the ideal of A generated by all polynomials $g \in A$ that change sign on $\alpha$ and $\beta$, i.e., $g(\alpha) \ge 0$ and $g(\beta) \le 0$. Any finite covering $\R^n = \bigcup_i P_i$ of closed, semi-algebraic sets induces a corresponding covering $\operatorname{Sper} A = \bigcup_i\tilde{P}_i$, so, in particular, when f is piecewise polynomial, there is a polynomial $f_i$ for every $\alpha\in\operatorname{Sper} A$ such that $f|_{P_i} = f_i|_{P_i}$ and $\alpha\in\tilde{P}_i$. This $f_i$ is termed the local polynomial representative of f at $\alpha$.

Madden's so-called local Pierce–Birkhoff conjecture at $\alpha$ and $\beta$, which is equivalent to the Pierce–Birkhoff conjecture, is as follows:

Let $\alpha$, $\beta$ be in $\operatorname{Sper} A$ and f be piecewise-polynomial. It is conjectured that for every local representative of f at $\alpha$, $f_\alpha$, and local representative of f at $\beta$, $f_\beta$, $f_\alpha - f_\beta$ is in the separating ideal of $\alpha$ and $\beta$.
