= Tognoli =

Tognoli is an Italian surname. Notable people with this surname include the following:

- Alberto Tognoli (1937–2008), Italian mathematician
- Carlo Tognoli (1938–2021), Italian politician

== See also ==
- Claudio Tognolli
