= Real plane curve =

In mathematics, a real plane curve is usually a real algebraic curve defined in the real projective plane.

== Ovals ==
The field of real numbers is not algebraically closed, the geometry of even a plane curve C in the real projective plane. Assuming no singular points, the real points of C form a number of ovals, in other words submanifolds that are topologically circles. The real projective plane has a fundamental group that is a cyclic group with two elements. Such an oval may represent either group element; in other words we may or may not be able to contract it down in the plane. Taking out the line at infinity L, any oval that stays in the finite part of the affine plane will be contractible, and so represent the identity element of the fundamental group; the other type of oval must therefore intersect L.

There is still the question of how the various ovals are nested. This was the topic of Hilbert's sixteenth problem. See Harnack's curve theorem for a classical result.

== See also ==
- Real algebraic geometry
- Ragsdale conjecture
