= Gabriele Vezzosi =

Italian mathematician

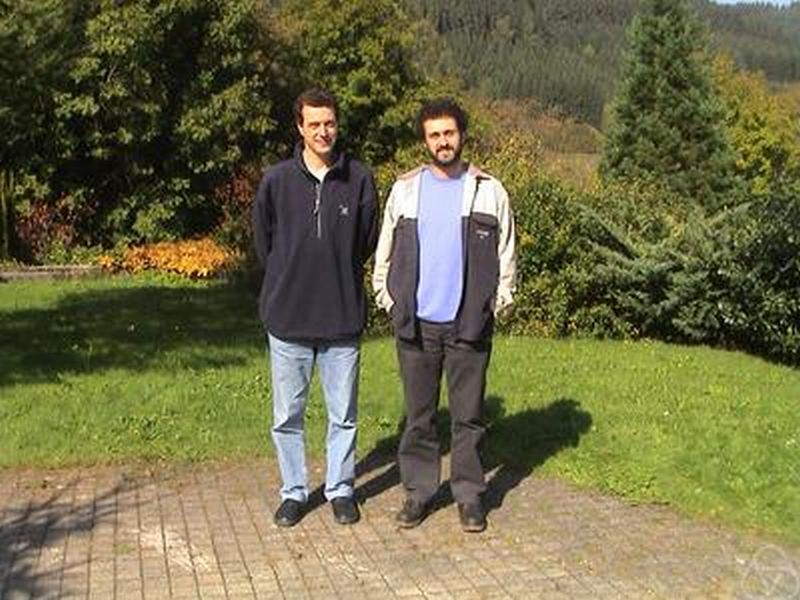
Gabriele Vezzosi and Bertrand Toen, Oberwolfach 2002

Gabriele Vezzosi is an Italian mathematician, born in Florence, Italy. His main interest is algebraic geometry.

Vezzosi earned an MS degree in Physics at the University of Florence, under the supervision of Alexandre M. Vinogradov, and a PhD in Mathematics at the Scuola Normale Superiore in Pisa, under the supervision of Angelo Vistoli. His first papers dealt with differential calculus over commutative rings, intersection theory, (equivariant) algebraic K-theory, motivic homotopy theory, and existence of vector bundles on singular algebraic surfaces.

Around 2001–2002 he started his collaboration with Bertrand Toën. Together, they created homotopical algebraic geometry (HAG), whose more relevant part is derived algebraic geometry (DAG), which is by now a powerful and widespread theory. Slightly later, this theory was reconsidered, and highly expanded by Jacob Lurie.

More recently, Vezzosi together with Tony Pantev, Bertrand Toën and Michel Vaquié defined a derived version of symplectic structures and studied important properties and examples (an important instance being Kai Behrend's symmetric obstruction theories); further together with Damien Calaque these authors introduced and studied a derived version of Poisson and coisotropic structures with applications to deformation quantization.

Lately Toën and Vezzosi (partly in collaboration with Anthony Blanc and Marco Robalo) moved to applications of derived and non-commutative geometry to arithmetic geometry, especially to Spencer Bloch's conductor conjecture.

Vezzosi also defined a derived version of quadratic forms, and in collaboration with Benjamin Hennion and Mauro Porta, proved a very general formal gluing result along non-linear flags with hints of application to a yet conjectural Geometric Langlands program for varieties of dimension bigger than 1. Together with Benjamin Antieau, Vezzosi proved a Hochschild–Kostant–Rosenberg theorem (HKR) for varieties of dimension p in characteristic p.

In 2015 he organised the Oberwolfach Seminar on Derived Geometry at the Mathematical Research Institute of Oberwolfach in Germany, and is an organiser of the one-semester thematic program at Mathematical Sciences Research Institute in Berkeley, California in 2019 on Derived algebraic geometry.

Vezzosi spent his career so far in Pisa, Florence, Bologna and Paris, has had three PhD students (Schürg, Porta and Melani) and is full professor at the University of Florence (Italy).
