= Bertrand Toën =

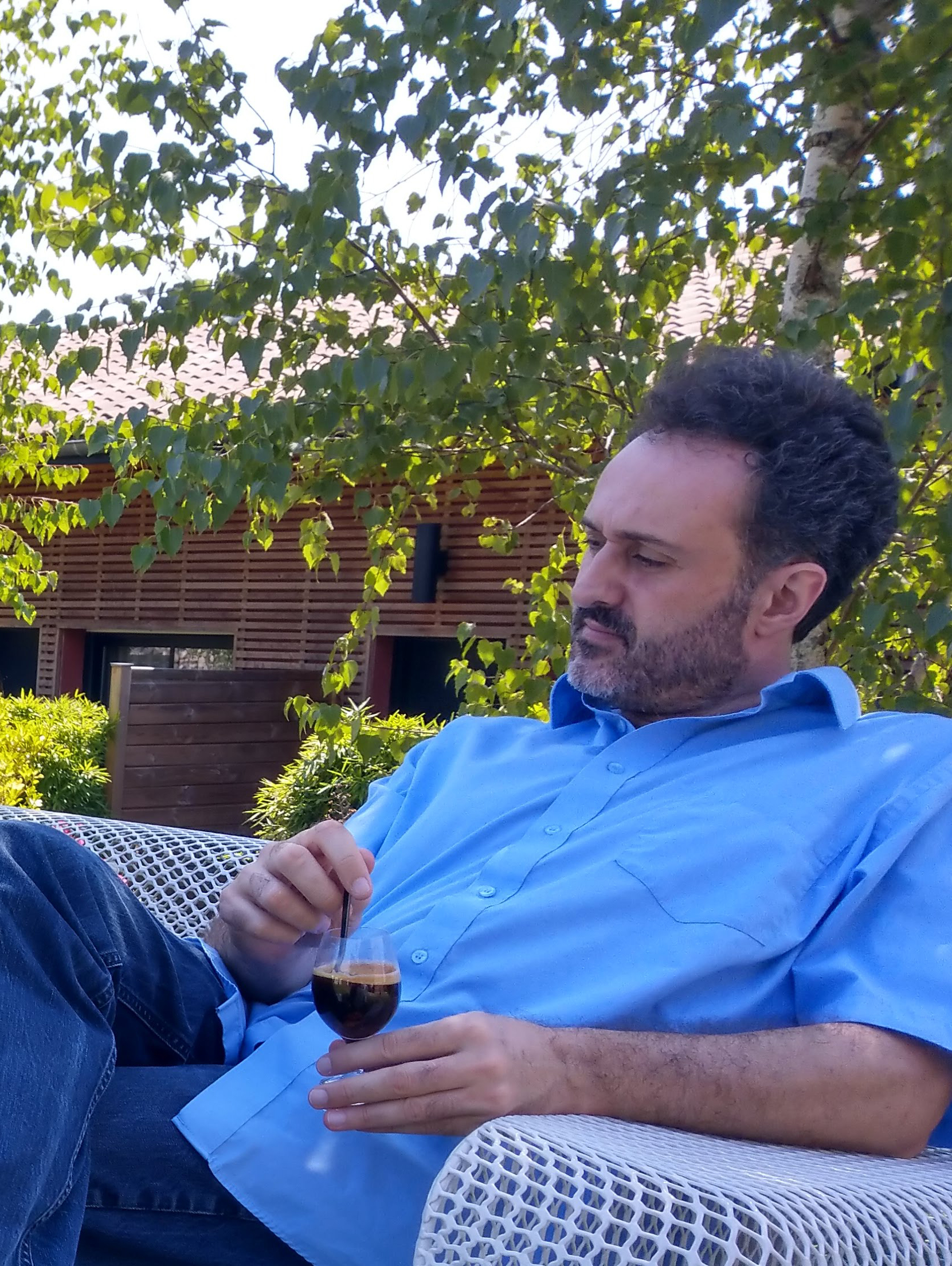
- Born: 17 September 1973 (age 53); Millau (France)
- Known for: Derived algebraic geometry
- Awards: Sophie Germain prize (2019)
- Scientific career
- Fields: Mathematics
- Workplaces: Paul Sabatier University, Toulouse
- Thesis: K-théorie et cohomologie des champs algébriques : théorèmes de Riemann-Roch, D-modules et théorèmes GAGA (1999)
- Doctoral advisor: Carlos Tschudi Simpson, Joseph Tapia
- Website: https://www.math-beb.net/

Bertrand Toën (born September 17, 1973 in Millau, France) is a mathematician working at Paul Sabatier University in Toulouse, specialising in algebraic geometry.

== Education and career ==
Toën received his PhD in 1999 from the Paul Sabatier University, where he was supervised by Carlos Simpson and Joseph Tapia. He was then a postdoc for two years at the Max Planck Institute for Mathematics in Bonn.

In 2001 he became Chargé de Recherche at the Centre national de la recherche scientifique (CNRS) in Université Côte-d'Azur in Nice, where he obtained his Habilitation in 2003. From 2003 to 2009 he worked as Chargé de Recherche in Toulouse.

In 2009 he became Directeur de Recherche at the CNRS at Université Montpellier, and from 2015 he returned to University Toulouse III.

He was an invited speaker at the International Congress of Mathematicians in 2014, speaking in the section on "Algebraic and Complex Geometry" with a talk "Derived Algebraic Geometry and Deformation Quantization".

He was awarded an ERC Advanced Grant in 2016. In 2019 he received the Sophie Germain prize.

== Research ==
Toën is a specialist of algebraic geometry. He is best known for his systematic use of homotopical methods in algebraic geometry. Together with Gabriele Vezzosi and Jacob Lurie he has laid the foundations of the subject of derived algebraic geometry and higher category theory. His works establish several contributions to noncommutative algebraic geometry in the sense of Kontsevich and (shifted) symplectic geometry.
