= Gloria Conyers Hewitt =

American mathematician (born 1935)

- Born: October 26, 1935 (age 91); Sumter, South Carolina
- Education: A.B., Fisk University Ph.D., University of Washington
- Known for: Group theory
- Scientific career
- Fields: Mathematics
- Workplaces: University of Montana
- Thesis: Direct and Inverse Limits of Abstract Algebras (1962)
- Doctoral advisor: Richard Scott Pierce

Gloria Conyers Hewitt (born October 26, 1935) is an American mathematician. She was the fourth African-American woman to receive a Ph.D. in mathematics. Her main research interests were in group theory and abstract algebra. She is the first African American woman to chair a math department in the United States.

== Early life and education ==
Hewitt was born on October 26, 1935, in Sumter, South Carolina. She entered Fisk University in 1952 and graduated in 1956 with a degree in secondary mathematics education. Without her knowledge, department chairman Lee Lorch recommended Hewitt to two graduate schools. As a result, she was offered a fellowship at the University of Washington in her senior year, though she had not applied for it. Hewitt received her master's degree from there in 1960, and then her Ph.D. (with a thesis on "Direct and Inverse Limits of Abstract Algebras") in 1962.

== Career ==
In 1961, Hewitt joined the faculty at the University of Montana. In 1966 she became tenured and promoted to associate professor, then in 1972, to full professor. In 1995, she was elected chair of the Department of Mathematical Science. She served in that position until she retired in June 1999, with the title of Professor Emeritus.

While a professor at the University of Montana she participated in multiple other organizations. She served on the executive council of the mathematical honor society, Pi Mu Epsilon. She served as the chair of the committee that writes questions for the mathematics section of the GREs. Hewitt was also a faculty consultant for the Advanced Placement examination in calculus. In 1995, she was awarded an ETS Certificate of Appreciation after twelve years of service.

Hewitt served on the Board of Governors of the Mathematical Association of America.

She was known for many mathematics accomplishments but most of all for being one of the first three black women to receive a mathematics award.

Hewitt's works focus on two mathematic areas: abstract algebra and group theory. She has eight published research papers and twenty-one unpublished lectures.

One would expect Hewitt to have faced many racial and gender oriented obstacles; however, in a personal interview she stated that she did not feel there had been any racial incidents in her career that had a detrimental effect on her studies. She did however, write an article in the Annals of the New York Academy of Sciences, titled "The Status of Women in Mathematics". Hewitt has said that "Some of my fellow graduate students did all they could to help and encourage me. They included me in most of their activities. I know this situation was not the norm for a lot of Blacks studying mathematics, but I was fortunate enough to be at the right place at the right time."

== Awards and recognition ==
She was awarded a prestigious National Science Foundation postdoctoral Science Faculty Fellowship. She was elected to the board of governors of the Mathematical Association of America. Her accomplishments have also earned her recognition by Mathematically Gifted & Black as a Black History Month 2018 Honoree. In 2018, the University of Washington established the Gloria Hewitt Endowed Graduate Student Support Fund in honor of Hewitt's immense contributions to the field of mathematics. The fund, established with an initial principal amount of $50,000, was set up to "promote excellence in the graduate program of the Department of Mathematics, in particular enhancing efforts to achieve a more equitable representation of those under-represented in the field of mathematics.

== Selected publications ==
- Hewitt, Gloria Conyers; Hannick, Francis T. (1989), "Characterizations of generalized Noetherian rings", Acta Mathematica Hungarica, 53 (1–2): 61–73, doi:10.1007/BF02170054, S2CID 122362771.
- Hewitt, Gloria Conyers (1978), A one model approach to group theory, Report, University of Montana.
- Hewitt, Gloria Conyers (1979), Emmy Noether's notions of finiteness conditions—revisited, Report, University of Montana.
- Hewitt, Gloria Conyers (1967), "Limits in certain classes of abstract algebras", Pacific Journal of Mathematics, 22 (1): 109–115, doi:10.2140/pjm.1967.22.109
- Hewitt, Gloria Conyers (January 1979), "On ℵ-noetherian conditions", Notices of the American Mathematical Society, 26: A-55
- Hewitt, Gloria Conyers (1963), "The existence of free unions in classes of abstract algebras", Proceedings of the American Mathematical Society, 14 (3): 417–422, doi:10.1090/S0002-9939-1963-0148591-X
- Hewitt, Gloria Conyers (April 1979), "The status of women in mathematics", Annals of the New York Academy of Sciences, 323 (1): 100–109, Bibcode:1979NYASA.323..100H, doi:10.1111/j.1749-6632.1979.tb16844.x, S2CID 83866914
- Hewitt, Gloria Conyers (November 1971), "Women in mathematics", American Mathematical Monthly
