= Skolem arithmetic =

Mathematical logic

In mathematical logic, Skolem arithmetic is the first-order theory of the natural numbers with multiplication, named in honor of Thoralf Skolem. The signature of Skolem arithmetic contains only the multiplication operation and equality, omitting the addition operation entirely.

Skolem arithmetic is weaker than Peano arithmetic, which includes both addition and multiplication operations. Unlike Peano arithmetic, Skolem arithmetic is a decidable theory. This means it is possible to effectively determine, for any sentence in the language of Skolem arithmetic, whether that sentence is provable from the axioms of Skolem arithmetic. The asymptotic running-time computational complexity of this decision problem is triply exponential.

== Axioms ==
We define the following abbreviations.

$$\begin{aligned}
a \mid b &:= \exists n\;(a \cdot n = b) \\
\operatorname{One}(e) &:= \forall n\;(n \cdot e = n) \\
\operatorname{Prime}(p) &:= \lnot\operatorname{One}(p) \land \forall a\;(a \mid p \to (\operatorname{One}(a) \lor a = p)) \\
\operatorname{PrimePower}(p, P) &:= \operatorname{Prime}(p) \land p \mid P \land \forall q\;(\operatorname{Prime}(q) \land \lnot(q = p) \to \lnot(q \mid P)) \\
\operatorname{InvAdicAbs}(p, n, P) &:= \operatorname{PrimePower}(p, P) \land P \mid n \land \forall Q\;((\operatorname{PrimePower}(p, Q) \land Q \mid n) \to Q \mid P) \\
\operatorname{AdicAbsDiff}_n(p, a, b) &:= \operatorname{Prime}(p) \land p \mid ab \land \exists P\,\exists Q\;(\operatorname{InvAdicAbs}(p, a, P) \land \operatorname{InvAdicAbs}(p, b, Q) \land Q = p^n P)
\end{aligned}$$
In plain English:

- $\operatorname{InvAdicAbs}(p, n, P)$ holds if and only if $P$ is the largest integer power of $p$ that divides $n$ exactly.
- $\operatorname{AdicAbsDiff}_n(p, a, b)$ holds if and only if the p-adic valuation of $b$ exceeds the p-adic valuation of $a$ by exactly $n$, i.e. $v_p(b) = v_p(a) + n$.

The axioms of Skolem arithmetic are:

1. $\forall a\,\forall b\;(ab = ba)$
2. $\forall a\,\forall b\,\forall c\;((ab)c = a(bc))$
3. $\exists e\;\operatorname{One}(e)$
4. $\forall a\,\forall b\;(\operatorname{One}(ab) \to \operatorname{One}(a) \land \operatorname{One}(b))$
5. $\forall a\,\forall b\,\forall c\;(ac = bc \to a = b)$
6. $\forall a\,\forall b\;(a^n = b^n \to a = b) \text{ for each integer } n > 0$
7. $\forall x\,\exists a\,\exists r\;(x = ar^n \land \forall b\,\forall s\;(x = bs^n \to a \mid b)) \text{ for each integer } n > 0$
8. $\forall a\,\exists p\;(\operatorname{Prime}(p) \land \lnot(p \mid a))$
9. $\forall p\,\forall P\,\forall Q\;((\operatorname{PrimePower}(p, P) \land \operatorname{PrimePower}(p, Q)) \to (P \mid Q \lor Q \mid P))$
10. $\forall p\,\forall n\;(\operatorname{Prime}(p) \to \exists P\;\operatorname{InvAdicAbs}(p, n, P))$
11. $\forall n\,\forall m\;\left(n = m \leftrightarrow \forall p\;(\operatorname{Prime}(p) \to \exists P\;(\operatorname{InvAdicAbs}(p, n, P) \land \operatorname{InvAdicAbs}(p, m, P)))\right)$
12. $\forall p\,\forall n\,\forall m\;\left(\operatorname{Prime}(p) \to \exists P\,\exists Q\;(\operatorname{InvAdicAbs}(p, n, P) \land \operatorname{InvAdicAbs}(p, m, Q) \land \operatorname{InvAdicAbs}(p, nm, PQ))\right)$
13. $\forall a\,\forall b\;\left(\forall p\;(\operatorname{Prime}(p) \to \exists P\,\exists Q\;(\operatorname{InvAdicAbs}(p, a, P) \land \operatorname{InvAdicAbs}(p, b, Q) \land P \mid Q)) \to a \mid b\right)$
14. $\forall a\,\forall b\,\exists c\,\forall p\;\left(\operatorname{Prime}(p) \to \left((p \mid a \to \exists P\;(\operatorname{InvAdicAbs}(p, b, P) \land \operatorname{InvAdicAbs}(p, c, P))) \land (p \mid b \to p \mid a)\right)\right)$
15. $\forall a\,\exists b\,\forall p\;\left(\operatorname{Prime}(p) \to \left(\exists P\;(\operatorname{InvAdicAbs}(p, a, P) \land \operatorname{InvAdicAbs}(p, b, pP))\right) \land (p \mid b \to p \mid a)\right)$
16. $\forall a\,\forall b\,\exists c\,\forall p\;\left(\operatorname{Prime}(p) \to \left((\operatorname{AdicAbsDiff}_n(p, a, b) \to \operatorname{InvAdicAbs}(p, c, p)) \land (p \mid c \to \operatorname{AdicAbsDiff}_n(p, a, b))\right)\right)$

== Expressive power ==
First-order logic with equality and multiplication of positive integers can express the relation $c = a \cdot b$. Using this relation and equality, we can define the following relations on positive integers:

- Divisibility: $b | c \ \Leftrightarrow \ \exists a ( c = a \cdot b )$
- Greatest common divisor: $d = \gcd(a,b) \ \Leftrightarrow \ d | a \land d | b \land \forall d' ( (d' | a \land d' | b) \Rightarrow d'|d )$
- Least common multiple: $m = \mathrm{lcm}(a,b) \ \Leftrightarrow \ a | m \land b | m \land \forall m'( (a | m' \land b | m') \Rightarrow m|m' )$
- the constant $1$: $\forall a ( 1|a )$
- Prime number: $\mathrm{prime}(p) \ \Leftrightarrow\ p \neq 1 \land \forall a ( a|p \Rightarrow (a = 1 \lor a = p))$
- Number $b$ is a product of $k$ primes (for a fixed $k$): $\exists a_1,...a_k (\ \mathrm{prime}(a_1) \land \ldots \land \mathrm{prime}(a_k) \land b = a_1 \cdot \ldots \cdot a_k )$
- Number $b$ is a power of some prime: $\mathrm{ppower}(b) \ \Leftrightarrow\ \exists p( \mathrm{prime}(p) \land \forall a((a \neq 1 \land a|b) \Rightarrow p|a))$
- Number $b$ is a product of exactly $k$ prime powers: $\exists a_1,...a_k(\ \mathrm{ppower}(a_1) \land \ldots \land \mathrm{ppower}(a_k) \land b = a_1 \cdot \ldots \cdot a_k )$

== Idea of decidability ==
The truth value of formulas of Skolem arithmetic can be reduced to the truth value of sequences of non-negative integers constituting their prime factor decomposition, with multiplication becoming point-wise addition of sequences. The decidability then follows from the Feferman–Vaught theorem that can be shown using quantifier elimination. Another way of stating this is that first-order theory of positive integers is isomorphic to the first-order theory of finite multisets of non-negative integers with the multiset sum operation, whose decidability reduces to the decidability of the theory of elements.

In more detail, according to the fundamental theorem of arithmetic, a positive integer $a > 1$ can be represented as a product of prime powers:

$$a = p_1^{a_1}p_2^{a_2} \cdots$$

If a prime number $p_k$ does not appear as a factor, we define its exponent $a_k$ to be zero. Thus, only finitely many exponents are non-zero in the infinite sequence $a_1,a_2,\ldots$. Denote such sequences of non-negative integers by $N^*$.

Now consider the decomposition of another positive number,

$$b = p_1^{b_1}p_2^{b_2} \cdots$$

The multiplication $a b$ corresponds point-wise addition of the exponents:

$$a b = p_1^{a_1 + b_1} p_2^{a_2 + b_2} \cdots$$

Define the corresponding point-wise addition on sequences by:

$$(a_1,a_2,\ldots) \bar{+} (b_1, b_2, \ldots) = (a_1 + b_1, a_2 + b_2, \ldots)$$

Thus we have an isomorphism between the structure of positive integers with multiplication, $(N,\cdot)$ and of point-wise addition of the sequences of non-negative integers in which only finitely many elements are non-zero, $(N^*, \bar{+})$.

From Feferman–Vaught theorem for first-order logic, the truth value of a first-order logic formula over sequences and pointwise addition on them reduces, in an algorithmic way, to the truth value of formulas in the theory of elements of the sequence with addition, which, in this case, is Presburger arithmetic. Because Presburger arithmetic is decidable, Skolem arithmetic is also decidable.

== Complexity ==
Ferrante & Rackoff (1979, Chapter 5) establish, using Ehrenfeucht–Fraïssé games, a method to prove upper bounds on decision problem complexity of weak direct powers of theories. They apply this method to obtain triply exponential space complexity for $(N^*, \bar{+})$, and thus of Skolem arithmetic.

Grädel (1989, Section 5) proves that the satisfiability problem for the quantifier-free fragment of Skolem arithmetic belongs to the NP complexity class.

== Decidable extensions ==
Thanks to the above reduction using Feferman–Vaught theorem, we can obtain first-order theories whose open formulas define a larger set of relations if we strengthen the theory of multisets of prime factors. For example, consider the relation $a \sim b$ that is true if and only if $a$ and $b$ have the equal number of distinct prime factors:

$$| \{ p \mid \mathrm{prime}(p) \land (p|a) \} | \ = \ | \{ p \mid \mathrm{prime}(p) \land (p|b) \} |$$

For example, $2^{10} \cdot 3^{100} \sim 5^8 \cdot 19^9$ because both sides denote a number that has two distinct prime factors.

If we add the relation $\sim$ to Skolem arithmetic, it remains decidable. This is because the theory of sets of indices remains decidable in the presence of the equinumerosity operator on sets, as shown by the Feferman–Vaught theorem.

== Undecidable extensions ==
An extension of Skolem arithmetic with the successor predicate, $succ(n)=n+1$ can define the addition relation using Tarski's identity:

$$(c = 0 \lor c = a + b) \Leftrightarrow (ac + 1)(bc + 1) = c^2 (ab + 1) + 1$$

and defining the relation $c = a + b$ on positive integers by

$$\mathrm{succ}(ac)\, \mathrm{succ}(bc) = \mathrm{succ}(c^2 \mathrm{succ}(ab))$$

Because it can express both multiplication and addition, the resulting theory is undecidable.

If we have an ordering predicate on natural numbers (less than, $<$), we can express $\mathrm{succ}$ by

$$\mathrm{succ}(a) = b \ \ \Leftrightarrow \ \ a < b \land \forall c. \big(a < c \Rightarrow (b = c \lor b < c)\big)$$

so the extension with $<$ is also undecidable.

== See also ==
- Presburger arithmetic
- Robinson arithmetic
- Quantifier elimination

== Bibliography ==
- Bès, Alexis (2001). "A Survey of Arithmetical Definability" (PDF). In Crabbé, Marcel; Point, Françoise; Michaux, Christian (eds.). A Tribute to Maurice Boffa. Brussels: Societé mathématique de Belgique. pp. 1–54.
- Bès, Alexis; Richard, Denis (1998). "Undecidable Extensions of Skolem Arithmetic". Journal of Symbolic Logic. 63 (2): 379–401. doi:10.2307/2586837. JSTOR 2586837. S2CID 14566619.
- Cégielski, Patrick (1981). "Théorie élémentaire de la multiplication des entiers naturels" (PDF). In Berline, Chantal; McAloon, Kenneth; Ressayre, Jean-Pierre (eds.). Model Theory and Arithmetic: Comptes Rendus d'une Action Thématique Programmée du C.N.R.S. sur la Théorie des Modèles et l'Arithmétique. Lecture Notes in Mathematics (in French). Vol. 890. Berlin: Springer. pp. 44–89. doi:10.1007/BFb0095657. ISBN 978-3-540-11159-7. "PDF points to a publicly available preprint."
- Ferrante, Jeanne; Rackoff, Charles W. (1979). The Computational Complexity of Logical Theories. Berlin Heidelberg New York: Springer-Verlag. doi:10.1007/BFb0062837. ISBN 3-540-09501-2.
- Grädel, Erich (June 1989). "Dominoes and the complexity of subclasses of logical theories". Annals of Pure and Applied Logic. 43 (1): 1–30. doi:10.1016/0168-0072(89)90023-7.
- Mostowski, Andrzej (1952). "On direct products of theories". Journal of Symbolic Logic. 17 (1): 1–31. doi:10.2307/2267454.
- Nadel, Mark E. (1981). "The completeness of Peano multiplication". Israel Journal of Mathematics. 39 (3): 225–233. doi:10.1007/bf02760851.
- Robinson, Julia Hall Bowman (1949). "Definability and Decision Problems in Arithmetic" (PDF). Journal of Symbolic Logic. 14 (2): 98–114. doi:10.2307/2266510. JSTOR 2266510. S2CID 40861592.
