= Richard S. Pierce =

American mathematician (1927 to 1992)

Richard Scott Pierce was an American logician and mathematician. His books on abstract algebras have become a standard references and graduate textbooks.

== Life ==
Richard Scott Pierce was born on February 26, 1927 in Los Angeles County, California. He studied at California Institute of Technology, earning his bachelor degree in 1950 and Ph.D. in 1952. This thesis, Homomorphisms of a Modular Lattice, was supervised by Robert P. Dilworth, a proponent of lattice theory.

For post-graduate study Pierce went to Yale University, where he was a fellow in the Office of Naval Research. From 1953 to 1955, he studied at Harvard University as a Jewette Research Fellow. There he became acquainted with Garrett Birkhoff. Together they made the Pierce-Birkhoff conjecture, which concerned a minimax approximation algorithm for polynomials.

In 1955, he commenced his teaching career at the University of Washington where he wrote his first textbook. He served as thesis advisor for Gloria Conyers Hewitt in 1962.

In 1970, he moved to the University of Hawaii, and in 1975 to the University of Arizona.

Pierce died on March 15, 1992. After his death, family and friends established The Richard Scott Memorial Endowment to support outstanding undergraduate math majors at University of Arizona.

== Books ==
Richard Pierce wrote two books about abstract algebra:

=== Introduction to the theory of Abstract Algebras (1968) ===
According to the preface, the book is intended to provide a systematic presentation of the basic results of universal algebra, a missing part of the published literature, except for books by P. M. Cohn (1965) and George Grätzer (1967), each with the title Universal Algebra. The scope includes "partial algebras with (possibly) infinitary operations or relations ... an effort is made to present all results at their maximal level of generality." Four chapters each present a particular theorem: the subdirect decomposition theorem, Øystein Ore's theorem on the uniqueness of direct decomposition, an existence theorem for free extensions, and Birkhoff's variety theorem. Regarding exercises, "some of the material presented in [the] problems is of recent vintage, and a few of the results have not been previously published." With a significant attention given to lattices, an alternative title for the book is "An introduction to the theory and uses of lattices". Pierce states, "This monograph was developed from lectures given over a number of years", and he acknowledges a decade of support from University of Washington and the National Science Foundation.

Page one begins: "The theory of abstract algebras is close enough to the foundations of mathematics that some care must be exercised using set theory." The Von_Neumann–Bernays–Gödel set theory is cited, with class and set as primitive notions. A class is the totality of things satisfying a property, and a set is a class of specific objects. He writes that proper classes are "so enormous that the intuition is incapable of assigning a magnitude to them." After defining a binary relation and its domain, he defines a partial mapping φ as a relation in which $\langle a,b\rangle\in \phi \ \text{and}\ \langle a,c\rangle \in \phi \ \text{implies}\ a = b .$ Then a partial mapping φ on A x B for which the domain is all of A is a mapping or function. "The definition is exact and convenient for all mathematical uses." (page 3)

The restriction of a relation to a subset A_{1} of A includes <a,b> in φ only if a is in A_{1}. The axiom of choice is necessary to show that, if a mapping φ is onto, then there is a mapping ψ such that the composition of mappings φ ψ is the identity mapping on B. (page 5)

=== Associative Algebras (1982) ===
According to the preface, "the classical results of the subject are explored more deeply than in most student-oriented expositions of associative algebras, and the recent developments in the theory of algebras are liberally sampled." Classical theorems of Joseph Wedderburn and Emil Artin are covered in the first part, and the second part addresses central simple algebras and the Brauer group of a field. The development follows the Jacobson density theorem, the Skolem–Noether theorem, and the double centralizer theorem.

The book is dedicated to Marilyn Pierce, who’s "patience and impatience kept the project moving from its beginning to the end."

== Selected works ==
- 1956: Birkhoff, Garrett; Pierce, Richard S. "Lattice-ordered rings". Anais da Academia Brasileira de Ciências. 28: 41–69. MR 0080099. Zbl 0070.26602.
- 1959: Translation Lattices via Google Books
- 1967: Modules over Commutative Regular Rings via Google Books
- 1968: Introduction to the Theory of Abstract Algebras, Holt, Rinehart & Winston
- 1972: Compact Zero-dimensional Metric Spaces of Finite Type, American Mathematical Society
- 1982: Associative Algebras, Graduate Texts in Mathematics #88
- 1984: History of the Mathematics Department from University of Arizona
- 1989: "Countable Boolean algebras", pages 775 to 876 in J.D. Monk & R. Bonnet (editors), Handbook of Boolean Algebras (Amsterdam/New York/Oxford/Tokyo, North-Holland), vol. 3 ISBN 978-0444871534
