= Decidable sublanguages of set theory =

In mathematical logic, various sublanguages of set theory are decidable. They are referred to as syllogistics. Together with the operations of set algebra, decidable languages include:

- Sets with monotone, additive, and multiplicative functions, but without quantifiers.
- Sets with restricted quantifiers.
