= Subanalytic set =

In mathematics, particularly in the subfield of real analytic geometry, a subanalytic set is a set of points (for example in Euclidean space) defined in a way broader than for semianalytic sets (roughly speaking, those satisfying conditions requiring certain real power series to be positive there). Subanalytic sets still have a reasonable local description in terms of submanifolds.

== Formal definitions ==
A subset V of a given Euclidean space E is semianalytic if each point of E has a neighbourhood U in E such that the intersection of V and U lies in the Boolean algebra of sets generated by subsets defined by inequalities f > 0, where f is a real analytic function. There is no Tarski–Seidenberg theorem for semianalytic sets, and projections of semianalytic sets are in general not semianalytic.

A subset V of E is a subanalytic set if for each point there exists a relatively compact semianalytic set X in a Euclidean space F of dimension at least as great as E, and a neighbourhood U in E, such that the intersection of V and U is a linear projection of X into E from F.

In particular all semianalytic sets are subanalytic. On an open dense subset, subanalytic sets are submanifolds and so they have a definite dimension "at most points". Semianalytic sets are contained in a real-analytic subvariety of the same dimension. However, subanalytic sets are not in general contained in any subvariety of the same dimension. On the other hand, there is a theorem, to the effect that a subanalytic set A can be written as a locally finite union of submanifolds.

Subanalytic sets are not closed under projections, however, because a real-analytic subvariety that is not relatively compact can have a projection which is not a locally finite union of submanifolds, and hence is not subanalytic.

== See also ==
- Semialgebraic set
