= Tarski's axiomatization of the reals =

Second-order theory of the real numbers

In 1936, Alfred Tarski gave an axiomatization of the real numbers and their arithmetic, consisting of only the eight axioms shown below and a mere four primitive notions: the set of reals denoted R, a binary relation over R, denoted by infix <, a binary operation of addition over R, denoted by infix +, and the constant 1.

Tarski's axiomatization, which is a second-order theory, can be seen as a version of the more usual definition of real numbers as the unique Dedekind-complete ordered field; it is however made much more concise by avoiding multiplication altogether and using unorthodox variants of standard algebraic axioms and other subtle tricks. Tarski did not supply a proof that his axioms are sufficient or a definition for the multiplication of real numbers in his system.

Tarski also studied the first-order theory of the structure (R, +, ·, <), leading to a set of axioms for this theory and to the concept of real closed fields.

== The axioms ==
=== Axioms of order (primitives: R, <) ===
Axiom 1
If x < y, then not y < x.

[That is, "<" is an asymmetric relation. This implies that "<" is irreflexive, i.e., for all x, not x < x.]

Axiom 2
If x < z, there exists a y such that x < y and y < z.
Axiom 3
For all subsets X, Y ⊆ R, if for all x ∈ X and y ∈ Y, x < y, then there exists a z such that for all x ∈ X and y ∈ Y, if x ≠ z and y ≠ z, then x < z and z < y.

[In other words, "<" is Dedekind-complete, or informally: "If a set of reals X precedes another set of reals Y, then there exists at least one real number z separating the two sets."
This is a second-order axiom as it refers to sets and not just elements.]

=== Axioms of addition (primitives: R, <, +) ===
Axiom 4
x + (y + z) = (x + z) + y.

[Note that this is an unorthodox mixture of associativity and commutativity.]

Axiom 5
For all x, y, there exists a z such that x + z = y.

[This allows subtraction and also gives a 0.]

Axiom 6
If x + y < z + w, then x < z or y < w.

[This is the contrapositive of a standard axiom for ordered groups.]

=== Axioms for 1 (primitives: R, <, +, 1) ===
Axiom 7
1 ∈ R.
Axiom 8
1 < 1 + 1.

== Discussion ==
Tarski stated, without proof, that these axioms turn the relation < into a total ordering. The missing component was supplied in 2008 by Stefanie Ucsnay.

The axioms then imply that R is a linearly ordered abelian group under addition with distinguished positive element 1, and that this group is Dedekind-complete, divisible, and Archimedean.

Tarski never proved that these axioms and primitives imply the existence of a binary operation called multiplication that has the expected properties, so that R becomes a complete ordered field under addition and multiplication. It is possible to define this multiplication operation by considering certain order-preserving homomorphisms of the ordered group (R,+,<).
