= Deductive closure =

Set of logical formulae containing all formulae able to be deduced from itself

In mathematical logic, a set $\mathcal{T}$ of logical formulae is deductively closed if it contains every formula $\varphi$ that can be logically deduced from $\mathcal{T}$; formally, if $\mathcal{T} \vdash \varphi$ always implies $\varphi \in \mathcal{T}$. If $T$ is a set of formulae, the deductive closure of $T$ is its smallest superset that is deductively closed.

The deductive closure of a theory $\mathcal{T}$ is often denoted $\operatorname{Ded}(\mathcal{T})$ or $\operatorname{Th}(\mathcal{T})$. Some authors do not define a theory as deductively closed (thus, a theory is defined as any set of sentences), but such theories can always be 'extended' to a deductively closed set. A theory may be referred to as a deductively closed theory to emphasize it is defined as a deductively closed set.

Deductive closure is a special case of the more general mathematical concept of closure — in particular, the deductive closure of $\mathcal{T}$ is exactly the closure of $\mathcal{T}$ with respect to the operation of logical consequence ($\vdash$).

== Examples ==
In propositional logic, the set of all true propositions is deductively closed. This is to say that only true statements are derivable from other true statements.

== Epistemic closure ==
In epistemology, many philosophers have and continue to debate whether particular subsets of propositions—especially ones ascribing knowledge or justification of a belief to a subject—are closed under deduction.
