= Η set =

Type of totally ordered set

In mathematics, an η set (eta set) is a type of totally ordered set introduced by Hausdorff (1907, p. 126, 1914, chapter 6 section 8) that generalizes the order type η of the rational numbers.

== Definition ==
If $\alpha$ is an ordinal then an $\eta_\alpha$ set is a totally ordered set in which for any two subsets $X$ and $Y$ of cardinality less than $\aleph_\alpha$, if every element of $X$ is less than every element of $Y$ then there is some element greater than all elements of $X$ and less than all elements of $Y$.

== Examples ==
The only non-empty countable η_{0} set (up to isomorphism) is the ordered set of rational numbers.

Suppose that κ = ℵ_{α} is a regular cardinal and let X be the set of all functions f from κ to {−1,0,1} such that if f(α) = 0 then f(β) = 0 for all β > α, ordered lexicographically. Then X is a η_{α} set. The direct limit of all these orders is isomorphic to the class of surreal numbers.

A dense totally ordered set without endpoints is an η_{α} set if and only if it is ℵ_{α} saturated.

== Properties ==
Any η_{α} set X is universal for totally ordered sets of cardinality at most ℵ_{α}, meaning that any such set can be embedded into X.

For any given ordinal α, any two η_{α} sets of cardinality ℵ_{α} are isomorphic (as ordered sets). An η_{α} set of cardinality ℵ_{α} exists if ℵ_{α} is regular and Σ_{β<α} 2^{ℵ_{β}} ≤ ℵ_{α}.
