= Alberto Tognoli =

Italian mathematician

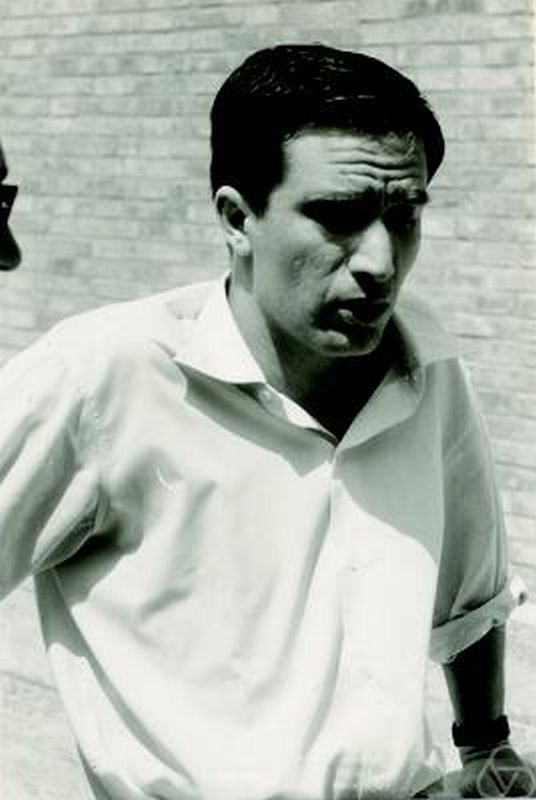
Alberto Tognoli (1967)

Alberto Tognoli (born 26 July 1937, Brescia, died 3 March 2008 in Rapallo) was an Italian mathematician, who worked on algebraic geometry.

Tognoli received his Ph.D. (Laurea) in 1960 from the University of Pisa. From 1970 he became full professor at the same university, and he also taught in Cosenza, Ferrara, Paris and Tours. He was also a professor of geometry at the University of Trento from 1986 until his retirement as professor emeritus in 2005.

He is known for his research on Nash functions and Nash manifolds (named after John Nash). He proved Nash's conjecture that smooth compact manifolds are diffeomorphic to non-singular real algebraic manifolds (known as the Theorem of Nash and Tognoli).

He received in 1974 the Caccioppoli Prize and in 1988 the gold medal in Mathematics of the Accademia dei XL.

Selected publications

- Algebraic Geometry and Nash Functions, Institutiones Mathematicae, Academic Press 1978
- as editor with M. Galbiati: Real analytic and algebraic geometry : proceedings of the conference held in Trento, Italy, October 3–7, 1988, Lecture Notes in Mathematics 1420, Springer Verlag 1990
- Singularities of Analytic Spaces, CIME, Rom: Cremonese 1975
- Introduzione alla teoria degli spazi analitici reali, Rom, Accademia dei Lincei 1976
- Approximation theorems and Nash conjecture, Memoires SMF, 38, 1974, 53–68, numdam
- Algebraic approximation of manifolds and spaces, Seminaire Bourbaki, No. 548, 1979/80, numdam
- Tognoli, Alberto (1988). "Analyticity of homology classes". Proc. Amer. Math. Soc. 104 (3): 920–922. doi:10.1090/s0002-9939-1988-0964874-2. MR 0964874.
- with Alessandro Tancredi: Tancredi, Alessandro; Tognoli, Alberto (2006). "On the products of Nash subvarieties by spheres". Proc. Amer. Math. Soc. 134 (4): 983–987. doi:10.1090/S0002-9939-05-08246-8. MR 2196028.
