= George E. Collins =

American mathematician and computer scientist

George Edwin Collins
- Born: January 10, 1928; Stuart, Iowa, U.S.
- Died: November 21, 2017 (aged 89); Madison, Wisconsin, U.S.
- Education: Cornell University
- Known for: Garbage collection (computer science)
- Scientific career
- Workplaces: University of Wisconsin–Madison, Ohio State University, RISC-Linz, University of Delaware, North Carolina State University
- Doctoral advisor: J. Barkley Rosser
- Doctoral students: Ellis Horowitz; David Musser

George E. Collins (born on January 10, 1928 in Stuart, Iowa – and died on November 21, 2017 in Madison, Wisconsin) was an American mathematician and computer scientist. He is the inventor of garbage collection by reference counting^{[G60]} and of the method of quantifier elimination by cylindrical algebraic decomposition.^{[G75]}

He received his PhD from Cornell University in 1955. He worked at IBM, the University of Wisconsin–Madison (1966–1986) Ohio State University, RISC-Linz, University of Delaware, and North Carolina State University.

== Selected publications ==
G60.	George E. Collins: A Method for Overlapping and Erasure of Lists, Commun. ACM, volume 3, number 12, 1960.

G75.	George E. Collins: Quantifier elimination for the elementary theory of real closed fields by cylindrical algebraic decomposition, Second GI Conf. Automata Theory and Formal Languages, Springer LNCS 33, 1975.
