= Regular =

Regular and regularity may refer to:

== Arts, entertainment, and media ==
=== Music ===
- "Regular" (Badfinger song)
- Regular tunings of stringed instruments, tunings with equal intervals between the paired notes of successive open strings

=== Other uses in arts, entertainment, and media ===
- Regular character, a main character who appears more frequently and/or prominently than a recurring character
- Regular division of the plane, a series of drawings by the Dutch artist M. C. Escher which began in 1936

== Language ==
- Regular inflection, the formation of derived forms such as plurals in ways that are typical for the language
  - Regular verb
- Regular script, the newest of the Chinese script styles

== Mathematics ==
=== Algebra and number theory ===
- Regular category, a kind of category that has similarities to both Abelian categories and to the category of sets
- Regular chains in computer algebra
- Regular element (disambiguation), certain kinds of elements of an algebraic structure
- Regular extension of fields
- Regular ideal (multiple definitions)
- Regular Lie group
- Regular matrix (disambiguation)
- Regular monomorphisms and regular epimorphisms, monomorphisms (resp. epimorphisms) which equalize (resp. coequalize) some parallel pair of morphisms
- Regular numbers, numbers which evenly divide a power of 60
- Regular p-group, a concept capturing some of the more important properties of abelian p-groups, but general enough to include most "small" p-groups
- Regular prime, a prime number p > 2 that does not divide the class number of the p-th cyclotomic field
- The regular representation of a group G, the linear representation afforded by the group action of G on itself
- Regular ring, a ring such that all its localizations have Krull dimension equal to the minimal number of generators of the maximal ideal
  - von Neumann regular ring, or absolutely flat ring (unrelated to the previous sense)
- Regular semi-algebraic systems in computer algebra
- Regular semigroup, related to the previous sense
- *-regular semigroup

=== Analysis ===
- Borel regular measure
- Cauchy-regular function (or Cauchy-continuous function,) a continuous function between metric spaces which preserves Cauchy sequences
- Regular functions, functions that are analytic and single-valued (unique) in a given region
- Regular measure, a measure for which every measurable set is "approximately open" and "approximately closed"
- The regular part, of a Laurent series, the series of terms with positive powers
- Regular singular points, in theory of ordinary differential equations where the growth of solutions is bounded by an algebraic function
- Regularity, the degree of differentiability of a function
- Regularity conditions arise in the study of first-class constraints in Hamiltonian mechanics
- Regularity of an elliptic operator
- Regularity theory of elliptic partial differential equations

=== Combinatorics, discrete math, and mathematical computer science ===
- Regular algebra, or Kleene algebra
- Regular code, an algebraic code with a uniform distribution of distances between codewords
- Regular expression, a type of pattern describing a set of strings in computer science
- Regular graph, a graph such that all the degrees of the vertices are equal
  - Szemerédi regularity lemma, some random behaviors in large graphs
- Regular language, a formal language recognizable by a finite state automaton (related to the regular expression)
- Regular map (graph theory), a symmetric tessellation of a closed surface
- Regular matroid, a matroid which can be represented over any field
- Regular paperfolding sequence, also known as the dragon curve sequence
- Regular tree grammar

=== Geometry ===
- Castelnuovo–Mumford regularity of a coherent sheaf
- Closed regular sets in solid modeling
- Irregularity of a surface in algebraic geometry
- Regular curves
- Regular grid, a tesselation of Euclidean space by congruent bricks
- Regular map (algebraic geometry), a map between varieties given by polynomials
- Regular point, a non-singular point of an algebraic variety
- Regular point of a differentiable map, a point at which a map is a submersion
- Regular polygons, polygons with all sides and angles equal
  - Regular polyhedron, a generalization of a regular polygon to higher dimensions
  - Regular polytope, a generalization of a regular polygon to higher dimensions
- Regular skew polyhedron

=== Logic, set theory, and foundations ===
- Axiom of Regularity, also called the Axiom of Foundation, an axiom of set theory asserting the non-existence of certain infinite chains of sets
- Partition regularity
- Regular cardinal, a cardinal number that is equal to its cofinality
- Regular modal logic

=== Probability and statistics ===
- Regular conditional probability, a concept that has developed to overcome certain difficulties in formally defining conditional probabilities for continuous probability distributions
- Regular stochastic matrix, a stochastic matrix such that all the entries of some power of the matrix are positive

=== Topology ===
- Free regular set, a subset of a topological space that is acted upon disjointly under a given group action
- Regular homotopy
- Regular isotopy in knot theory, the equivalence relation of link diagrams that is generated by using the 2nd and 3rd Reidemeister moves only
- Regular space (or $T_3$) space, a topological space in which a point and a closed set can be separated by neighborhoods

== Military ==
- Regular army, the official army of a state or country
  - British Regulars, of the 18th and 19th centuries
  - Regular Army (United States)
  - Regular Force, of the Canadian Forces

== Organizations ==
- Regular Baptists, an 18th-century American and Canadian Baptist group
- Regular clergy, members of a religious order subject to a rule of life
- Regular Masonic jurisdictions, or regularity, refers to the constitutional mechanism by which Freemasonry Grand Lodges or Grand Orients give one another mutual recognition

== People ==
- Moses Regular (born 1971), America football player

== Science and social science ==
- Regular economy, an economy characterized by an excess demand function whose slope at any equilibrium price vector is non-zero
- Regular moon, a natural satellite that has low eccentricity and a relatively close and prograde orbit
- Regular solutions in chemistry, solutions that diverge from the behavior of an ideal solution only moderately

== Other uses ==
- Regular bowel movements, the opposite of constipation
- Regular customer, a person who frequently visits the same restaurant, pub, store, transit provider, etc.
- Regular octane rating of gasoline, as a differentiation from "premium" and similar variants
- Regular stance (or footedness) in boardsports, a stance in which the left foot leads (as compared to "goofy")
- Regular type, referring to Roman type, an upright style of typeface or computer font, as compared to italic and blackletter
- Presumption of regularity, a legal principle

== See also ==
- Irregular (disambiguation)
- Regular set (disambiguation)
- Quasiregular (disambiguation)
