= Anomaly =

Anomaly, The Anomaly or Anomalies may refer to:

== Science ==
=== Astronomy ===
- In astronomy, an anomaly of an elliptical orbit, generally measured with respect to an apsis, usually the periapsis
- Anomalous precession, another term for "apsidal precession"
- Eccentric anomaly, an intermediate value used to compute the position of a celestial object as a function of time
- Flyby anomaly, an unexpected energy increase during the flybys of the Earth by various satellites
- Mean anomaly, a measure of time in the study of orbital dynamics
- Pioneer anomaly, the observed deviation of the trajectories of some uncrewed space probes, and especially Pioneer 10 and Pioneer 11
- South Atlantic Anomaly, an area where the Earth's inner Van Allen radiation belt comes closest to the Earth's surface
- True anomaly, the angle between the direction of periapsis and the current position of an object on its orbit

=== Other uses in science ===
- Anomalistics, the study of scientific anomalies
- Anomalous, a species of moth in the Noctuid family
- Chromosome anomaly, a disorder caused by a structural error in a chromosome or an atypical number of chromosomes
- Genetic anomaly, a disorder caused by mutation
- Teratology, the study of developmental anomalies

==== Congenital anomalies ====
- Congenital anomaly (birth defect), a disorder present at birth
  - Physical anomaly, a deformation of an anatomical structure
    - Congenital vertebral anomaly, any of several malformations of the spine
  - Collie eye anomaly, eye disease of dogs
  - Coronary artery anomaly, a congenital abnormality in the heart
  - Ebstein's anomaly, a congenital heart defect
  - Uhl anomaly, a congenital heart disease affecting the myocardial muscle
  - Vaginal anomalies

=== Earth sciences ===
- Anomaly (natural sciences)
  - Atmospheric anomaly
  - Geophysical anomaly

=== Physics ===
- Anomalous diffusion, the movement of molecules from a region of lower concentration to a region of higher concentration
- Anomalous dispersion (optics), when the speed of an electromagnetic wave increases with increasing frequency
- Anomalon, a hypothetical type of nuclear matter that shows an anomalously large reactive cross section
- Anomaly (physics), a failure of a symmetry of a theory's classical action
- Conformal anomaly, a quantum phenomenon that breaks the conformal symmetry of the classical theory
- Chiral anomaly, an anomalous nonconservation of a chiral current
- Gauge anomaly, the effect of quantum mechanics that invalidates the gauge symmetry of a quantum field theory
- Global anomaly, in quantum physics
- Gravitational anomaly, an effect in quantum mechanics that invalidates the general covariance of some theories of general relativity
- Konishi anomaly, the violation of the conservation of the Noether current associated with certain transformations
- Mixed anomaly, an effect in quantum mechanics
- Parity anomaly, associated with parity

== Arts and media ==
=== Fictional characters ===
- Anomaly (comics), a villain in DC Comics
- Entities in the SCP universe, often referred to as "anomalies"

=== Fictional features in media ===
- Anomaly, a rift in the space-time continuum in the television series Futurama
- Anomaly, a time portal in the TV series Primeval
- The Fortean anomaly, in the work of Charles Fort
- Spatial anomaly, an extraordinary disruption in the space-time continuum in the Star Trek universe
- The Tycho Magnetic Anomaly (TMA) on the Moon in the novel and in the film 2001: A Space Odyssey by Sir Arthur C. Clarke and Stanley Kubrick

=== Film and television ===
- "Anomaly" (Star Trek: Enterprise), a 2003 episode of Star Trek: Enterprise
- The Anomaly (film), 2014

=== Video and table-top games ===
- Anomaly: Warzone Earth, a 2011 real time strategy video game
  - Anomaly Korea
  - Anomaly 2
- Anomaly Collapse, a 2024 turn-based strategy video game
- Anomalies (Traveller), a 1997 anthology of nine adventures for the role-playing game Traveller

=== Literature ===
- The Anomalies, a 2003 novel by Joey Goebel
- Anomaly (series), a 2013 trilogy by Krista McGee
- Anomaly (graphic novel), by Brian Haberlin
- The Anomaly (novel), by French author Hervé Le Tellier

=== Music ===
==== Albums ====
- Anomaly (Ace Frehley album) (2009)
- Anomalies (album) (2005), by Cephalic Carnage
- Anomaly (The Hiatus album) (2010)
- Anomaly (Lecrae album) (2014)
- Anomalies, Vol. 1 (2010), by Cave In

==== Songs ====
- "Anna Molly" (a word play on the word "anomaly"), by Incubus
- "Anomaly", 2004, by Psyopus from Ideas of Reference
- "An Anomaly", 2007, by It Prevails from The Inspiration
- "The Anomaly", 2011, by Scar Symmetry from The Unseen Empire
- "Anomaly", 2012, by KB from Weight & Glory

== Business ==
- Market anomaly, a distortion in prices in a financial market
- Anomaly (advertising agency), a marketing communications agency based in New York

== Technology ==
- Anomaly detection, the process of detecting anomalies from the other, relevant data
- Anomaly in software, any condition that deviates from expectation

== Other uses ==
- Anomalistics, the study of scientific anomalies
- Ararat anomaly, an object on Mount Ararat in Turkey claimed to be the remains of Noah's Ark
- Jayson Tatum, a basketball player nicknamed "The Anomaly"

== See also ==
- Irregular (disambiguation)
- Outlier
