= Relation algebra =

Type of residuated Boolean algebra with extra structure

In mathematics and abstract algebra, a relation algebra is a residuated Boolean algebra expanded with an involution called converse, a unary operation. The motivating example of a relation algebra is the algebra $2^{X^2}$ of all binary relations on a set $X$, that is, subsets of the cartesian square $X^2$, with $R\bullet S$ interpreted as the usual composition of binary relations $R$ and $S$, and with the converse of $R$ as the converse relation.

Relation algebra emerged in the 19th-century work of Augustus De Morgan and Charles Peirce, which culminated in the algebraic logic of Ernst Schröder. The equational form of relation algebra treated here was developed by Alfred Tarski and his students, starting in the 1940s. Tarski and Givant (1987) applied relation algebra to a variable-free treatment of axiomatic set theory, with the implication that mathematics founded on set theory could itself be conducted without variables.

== Definition ==
A relation algebra $(L,\wedge,\vee,^-,0,1,\bullet,\mathbf I,\breve{})$ is an algebraic structure equipped with the Boolean operations of conjunction $x\wedge y$, disjunction $x\vee y$, and negation $x^-$, the Boolean constants $0$ and $1$, the relational operations of composition $x\bullet y$ and converse $x\breve{}$, and the relational constant $\mathbf I$, such that these operations and constants satisfy certain equations constituting an axiomatization of a calculus of relations. Roughly, a relation algebra is to a system of binary relations on a set containing the empty ($0$), universal ($1$), and identity $\mathbf I$ relations and closed under these five operations as a group is to a system of permutations of a set containing the identity permutation and closed under composition and inverse. However, the first-order theory of relation algebras is not complete for such systems of binary relations.

Following Jónsson and Tsinakis (1993) it is convenient to define additional operations $x\triangleleft y=x\bullet y\breve{}$, and, dually, $x\triangleright y=x\breve{}\bullet y$. Jónsson and Tsinakis showed that $\mathbf I\triangleleft x=x\triangleright\mathbf I$, and that both were equal to $x\breve{}$. Hence a relation algebra can equally well be defined as an algebraic structure $(L,\wedge,\vee,^-,0,1,\bullet,\mathbf I,\triangleleft,\triangleright)$. The advantage of this signature over the usual one is that a relation algebra can then be defined in full simply as a residuated Boolean algebra for which $\mathbf I\triangleleft x$ is an involution, that is, $\mathbf I\triangleleft(\mathbf I\triangleleft x)=x$. The latter condition can be thought of as the relational counterpart of the equation $1/(1/x)=x$ for ordinary arithmetic reciprocal, and some authors use reciprocal as a synonym for converse.

Since residuated Boolean algebras are axiomatized with finitely many identities, so are relation algebras. Hence the latter form a variety, the variety RA of relation algebras. Expanding the above definition as equations yields the following finite axiomatization.

=== Axioms ===
The axioms B1-B10 below are adapted from Givant (2006: 283), and were first set out by Tarski in 1948.

$L$ is a Boolean algebra under binary disjunction, $\vee$, and unary complementation $()^-$:

B1: $A\vee B=B\vee A$
B2: $(A\vee B)\vee C=A\vee(B\vee C)$
B3: $(A^-\vee B)^-\vee(A^-\vee B^-)^-=A$

This axiomatization of Boolean algebra is due to Huntington (1933). Note that the meet of the implied Boolean algebra is not the $\bullet$ operator (even though it distributes over $\vee$ like a meet does), nor is the $1$ of the Boolean algebra the $\mathbf I$ constant.

$L$ is a monoid under binary composition ($\bullet$) and nullary identity $\mathbf I$:

B4: $(A\bullet B)\bullet C=A\bullet (B\bullet C)$
B5: $A\bullet\mathrm I=A$

Unary converse $()\breve{}$ is an involution with respect to composition:

B6: $A\breve{}\breve{}=A$
B7: $(A\bullet B)\breve{}=B\breve{}\bullet A\breve{}$

Axiom B6 defines conversion as an involution, whereas B7 expresses the antidistributive property of conversion relative to composition.

Converse and composition distribute over disjunction:

B8: $(A\vee B)\breve{}=A\breve{}\vee B\breve{}$
B9: $(A\vee B)\bullet C=(A \bullet C)\vee(B\bullet C)$

B10 is Tarski's equational form of the fact, discovered by Augustus De Morgan, that $A\bullet B\le C^-\ \Leftrightarrow\ A\breve{}\bullet C\le B^-\ \Leftrightarrow\ C\bullet B\breve{}\le A^-$

B10: $(A\breve{}\bullet(A\bullet B)^-)\vee B^-=B^-$

These axioms are ZFC theorems; for the purely Boolean B1-B3, this fact is trivial. After each of the following axioms is shown the number of the corresponding theorem in Chapter 3 of Suppes (1960), an exposition of ZFC: B4 27, B5 45, B6 14, B7 26, B8 16, B9 23.

== Expressing properties of binary relations in RA ==
The following table shows how many of the usual properties of binary relations can be expressed as succinct RA equalities or inequalities. Below, an inequality of the form $A\le B$ is shorthand for the Boolean equation $A\vee B=B$.

The most complete set of results of this nature is Chapter C of Carnap (1958), where the notation is rather distant from that of this entry. Chapter 3.2 of Suppes (1960) contains fewer results, presented as ZFC theorems and using a notation that more resembles that of this entry. Neither Carnap nor Suppes formulated their results using the RA of this entry, or in an equational manner.

$R$ is	If and only if:
Functional	$R\breve{}\bullet R\le\mathbf I$
Left-total	$\mathbf I\le R\bullet R\breve{}$ ($R\breve{}$ is surjective)
Function	$R$ is functional and left-total.
Injective	$R\bullet R\breve{}\le\mathbf I$ ($R\breve{}$ is functional)
Surjective	$\mathbf I\le R\breve{}\bullet R$ ($R\breve{}$is left-total)
Bijective	$R\breve{}\bullet R=R\bullet R\breve{}=\mathbf I$ (Injective surjective function)
Transitive	$R\bullet R\le R$
Reflexive	$\mathbf I\le R$
Coreflexive	$R\le\mathbf I$
Irreflexive	$R\wedge\mathbf I=0$
Symmetric	$R=R\breve{}$
Antisymmetric	$R\wedge R\breve{}\le\mathbf I$
Asymmetric	$R\wedge R\breve{}=0$
Strongly connected	$R\vee R\breve{}=1$
Connected	$\mathbf I\vee R\vee R\breve{}=1$
Idempotent	$R\bullet R=R$
Preorder	$R$ is transitive and reflexive.
Equivalence	$R$ is a symmetric preorder.
Partial order	$R$ is an antisymmetric preorder.
Total order	$R$ is strongly connected and a partial order.
Strict partial order	$R$ is transitive and irreflexive.
Strict total order	$R$ is connected and a strict partial order.
Dense	$R\wedge\mathbf I^-\le(R\wedge\mathbf I^-)\bullet(R\wedge\mathbf I^-)$

== Expressive power ==
The metamathematics of RA are discussed at length in Tarski and Givant (1987), and more briefly in Givant (2006).

RA consists entirely of equations manipulated using nothing more than uniform replacement and the substitution of equals for equals. Both rules are wholly familiar from school mathematics and from abstract algebra generally. Hence RA proofs are carried out in a manner familiar to all mathematicians, unlike the case in mathematical logic generally.

RA can express any (and up to logical equivalence, exactly the) first-order logic (FOL) formulas containing no more than three variables. (A given variable can be quantified multiple times and hence quantifiers can be nested arbitrarily deeply by "reusing" variables.) Surprisingly, this fragment of FOL suffices to express Peano arithmetic and almost all axiomatic set theories ever proposed. Hence RA is, in effect, a way of algebraizing nearly all mathematics, while dispensing with FOL and its connectives, quantifiers, turnstiles, and modus ponens. Because RA can express Peano arithmetic and set theory, Gödel's incompleteness theorems apply to it; RA is incomplete, incompletable, and undecidable. (N.B. The Boolean algebra fragment of RA is complete and decidable.)

The representable relation algebras, forming the class RRA, are those relation algebras isomorphic to some relation algebra consisting of binary relations on some set, and closed under the intended interpretation of the RA operations. It is easily shown, e.g. using the method of pseudoelementary classes, that RRA is a quasivariety, that is, axiomatizable by a universal Horn theory. In 1950, Roger Lyndon proved the existence of equations holding in RRA that did not hold in RA. Hence the variety generated by RRA is a proper subvariety of the variety RA. In 1955, Alfred Tarski showed that RRA is itself a variety. In 1964, Donald Monk showed that RRA has no finite axiomatization, unlike RA which is finitely axiomatized by definition.

=== Q-relation algebras ===
An RA is a Q-relation algebra (QRA) if, in addition to B1-B10, there exist some $A$ and $B$ such that (Tarski and Givant 1987: §8.4):

Q0: $A\breve{}\bullet A\le\mathbf I$
Q1: $B\breve{}\bullet B\le\mathbf I$
Q2: $A\breve{}\bullet B=1$

Essentially these axioms imply that the universe has a (non-surjective) pairing relation whose projections are $A$ and $B$. It is a theorem that every QRA is a RRA (Proof by Maddux, see Tarski & Givant 1987: 8.4(iii)).

Every QRA is representable (Tarski and Givant 1987). That not every relation algebra is representable is a fundamental way RA differs from QRA and Boolean algebras, which, by Stone's representation theorem for Boolean algebras, are always representable as sets of subsets of some set, closed under union, intersection, and complement.

== Examples ==
1. Any Boolean algebra can be turned into a RA by interpreting conjunction as composition (the monoid multiplication $\bullet$), i.e. $x\bullet y$ is defined as $x\wedge y$. This interpretation requires that converse interpret identity ($y\breve{}=y$), and that both residuals $y\backslash x$ and $x/y$ interpret the conditional $y\to x$ (i.e., $\neg y\vee x$).
2. The motivating example of a relation algebra depends on the definition of a binary relation $R$ on a set $X$ as any subset $R\subseteq X^2$, where $X^2$ is the cartesian square of $X$. The power set $2^{X^2}$ consisting of all binary relations on $X$ is a Boolean algebra. While $2^{X^2}$ can be made a relation algebra by taking $R\bullet S=R\wedge S$, as per example (1) above, the standard interpretation of $\bullet$ is instead $x(R\bullet S)z=\exists y:xRy.ySz$. That is, the ordered pair $(x,z)$ belongs to the relation $R\bullet S$ just when there exists $y\in X$ such that $(x,y)\in R$ and $(y,z)\in S$. This interpretation uniquely determines $R\backslash S$ as consisting of all pairs $(y,z)$ such that for all $x\in X$, if $xRy$ then $xSz$. Dually, $S/R$ consists of all pairs $(x,y)$ such that for all $z\in X$, if $yRz$ then $xSz$. The translation $R\breve{}=\neg(R\backslash\neg\mathbf I)$ then establishes the converse $R\breve{}$ of $R$ as consisting of all pairs $(y,x)$ such that $(x,y)\in R$.
3. An important generalization of the previous example is the power set $2^E$ where $E\subseteq X^2$ is any equivalence relation on the set $X$. This is a generalization because $X^2$ is itself an equivalence relation, namely the complete relation consisting of all pairs. While $2^E$ is not a subalgebra of $2^{X^2}$ when $E\neq X^2$ (since in that case it does not contain the relation $X^2$, the top element $1$ being $E$ instead of $X^2$), it is nevertheless turned into a relation algebra using the same definitions of the operations. Its importance resides in the definition of a representable relation algebra as any relation algebra isomorphic to a subalgebra of the relation algebra $2^E$ for some equivalence relation $E$ on some set. The previous section says more about the relevant metamathematics.
4. Let $G$ be a group. Then the power set $2^G$ is a relation algebra with the obvious Boolean algebra operations, composition given by the product of group subsets, the converse by the inverse subset ($A^{-1} = \{a^{-1} \!: a \in A\}$), and the identity by the singleton subset $\{e\}$. There is a relation algebra homomorphism embedding $2^G$ in $2^{G \times G}$ which sends each subset $A \subset G$ to the relation $R_A = \{(g, h) \in G \times G : h \in A g\}$. The image of this homomorphism is the set of all right-invariant relations on $G$.
5. If group sum or product interprets composition, group inverse interprets converse, group identity interprets $\mathbf I$, and if $R$ is a one-to-one correspondence, so that $R\breve{}\bullet R=R\bullet R\breve{}=\mathbf I$, then $L$ is a group. B4-B7 become well-known theorems of group theory, so that RA becomes a proper extension of group theory as well as of Boolean algebra.

== Historical remarks ==
De Morgan founded RA in 1860, but C. S. Peirce took it much further and became fascinated with its philosophical power. The work of DeMorgan and Peirce came to be known mainly in the extended and definitive form Ernst Schröder gave it in Vol. 3 of his Vorlesungen (1890–1905). Principia Mathematica drew strongly on Schröder's RA, but acknowledged him only as the inventor of the notation. In 1912, Alwin Korselt proved that a particular formula in which the quantifiers were nested four deep had no RA equivalent. This fact led to a loss of interest in RA until Tarski (1941) began writing about it. His students have continued to develop RA down to the present day. Tarski returned to RA in the 1970s with the help of Steven Givant; this collaboration resulted in the monograph by Tarski and Givant (1987), the definitive reference for this subject. For more on the history of RA, see Maddux (1991, 2006).

== Software ==
- RelMICS / Relational Methods in Computer Science maintained by Wolfram Kahl
- Carsten Sinz: ARA / An Automatic Theorem Prover for Relation Algebras
- Stef Joosten, Relation Algebra as programming language using the Ampersand compiler, Journal of Logical and Algebraic Methods in Programming, Volume 100, April 2018, Pages 113–129. (see also https://ampersandtarski.github.io/)

== See also ==
- Algebraic logic
- Allegory (category theory)
- Binary relation
- Cartesian product
- Cartesian square
- Cylindric algebras
- Extension in logic
- Involution
- Logic of relatives
- Logical matrix
- Predicate functor logic
- Quantale
- Relation
- Relational calculus
- Relational algebra
- Residuated Boolean algebra
- Spatial-temporal reasoning
- Theory of relations
- Triadic relation
