= Multimodal logic =

A multimodal logic is a modal logic that has more than one primitive modal operator. They find substantial applications in theoretical computer science.

== Overview ==
A modal logic with n primitive unary modal operators $\Box_i, i\in \{1,\ldots, n\}$ is called an n-modal logic. Given these operators and negation, one can always add $\Diamond_i$ modal operators defined as $\Diamond_i P$ if and only if $\lnot \Box_i \lnot P$, to give a classical multimodal logic if it is in addition stable under necessitation (or "possibilization", therefore) of both members of provable equivalences.

Perhaps the first substantive example of a two-modal logic is Arthur Prior's tense logic, with two modalities, F and P, corresponding to "sometime in the future" and "sometime in the past". A logic with infinitely many modalities is dynamic logic, introduced by Vaughan Pratt in 1976 and having a separate modal operator for every regular expression. A version of temporal logic introduced in 1977 and intended for program verification has two modalities, corresponding to dynamic logic's [A] and [A*] modalities for a single program A, understood as the whole universe taking one step forwards in time. The term multimodal logic itself was not introduced until 1980. Another example of a multimodal logic is the Hennessy–Milner logic, itself a fragment of the more expressive modal μ-calculus, which is also a fixed-point logic.

Multimodal logic can be used also to formalize a kind of knowledge representation: the motivation of epistemic logic is allowing several agents (they are regarded as subjects capable of forming beliefs, knowledge); and managing the belief or knowledge of each agent, so that epistemic assertions can be formed about them. The modal operator $\Box$ must be capable of bookkeeping the cognition of each agent, thus $\Box_i$ must be indexed on the set of the agents. The motivation is that $\Box_i \alpha$ should assert "The subject i has knowledge about $\alpha$ being true". But it can be used also for formalizing "the subject i believes $\alpha$". For formalization of meaning based on the possible world semantics approach, a multimodal generalization of Kripke semantics can be used: instead of a single "common" accessibility relation, there is a series of them indexed on the set of agents.
