= Permutation representation (disambiguation) =

In mathematics, permutation representation may refer to:

- A group action, see also Permutation representation
- A representation of a symmetric group (see Representation theory of the symmetric group)
