= Quasiregular =

In mathematics, quasiregular may refer to:

- Quasiregular element, in the context of ring theory
- Quasiregular map in analysis
- Quasiregular polyhedron, in the context of geometry
- Quasiregular representation, in the context of representation theory
