= Dense order =

Type of ordering of a set

In mathematics, a partial order or total order < on a set $X$ is said to be dense if, for all $x$ and $y$ in $X$ for which $x < y$, there is a $z$ in $X$ such that $x < z < y$. That is, for any two elements, one less than the other, there is another element between them. For total orders this can be simplified to "for any two distinct elements, there is another element between them", since all elements of a total order are comparable.

Equivalently, a partial order is dense precisely if its covering relation is empty.

== Example ==
The rational numbers as a linearly ordered set are a densely ordered set in this sense, as are the algebraic numbers, the real numbers, the dyadic rationals and the decimal fractions. In fact, every Archimedean ordered ring extension of the integers $\mathbb{Z}[x]$ is a densely ordered set.

Proof

For the element $x\in\mathbb{Z}[x]$, due to the Archimedean property, if $x > 0$, there exists a largest integer $n < x$ with $n < x < n + 1$, and if $x < 0$, $-x > 0$, and there exists a largest integer $m = -n - 1 < -x$ with $-n - 1 < -x < -n$. As a result, $0 < x - n < 1$. For any two elements $y, z\in\mathbb{Z}[x]$ with $z < y$, $0 < (x - n)(y - z) < y - z$ and $z < (x - n)(y - z) + z < y$. Therefore $\mathbb{Z}[x]$ is dense.

On the other hand, the linear ordering on the integers is not dense.

== Uniqueness for total dense orders without endpoints ==
Georg Cantor proved that every two non-empty dense totally ordered countable sets without lower or upper bounds are order-isomorphic. This makes the theory of dense linear orders without bounds an example of an ω-categorical theory where ω is the smallest limit ordinal. For example, there exists an order-isomorphism between the rational numbers and other densely ordered countable sets including the dyadic rationals and the algebraic numbers. The proofs of these results use the back-and-forth method.

Minkowski's question mark function can be used to determine the order isomorphisms between the quadratic algebraic numbers and the rational numbers, and between the rationals and the dyadic rationals.

== Generalizations ==
Any binary relation R is said to be dense if, for all R-related x and y, there is a z such that x and z and also z and y are R-related. Formally:

$\forall x\ \forall y\ xRy\Rightarrow (\exists z\ xRz \land zRy).$ Alternatively, in terms of composition of R with itself, the dense condition may be expressed as R ⊆ (R ; R).

Sufficient conditions for a binary relation R on a set X to be dense are:

- R is reflexive;
- R is coreflexive;
- R is quasireflexive;
- R is left or right Euclidean; or
- R is symmetric and semi-connex and X has at least 3 elements.

None of them are necessary. For instance, there is a relation R that is not reflexive but dense. A non-empty and dense relation cannot be antitransitive.

A strict partial order < is a dense order if and only if < is a dense relation. A dense relation that is also transitive is said to be idempotent.

== See also ==
- Dense set — a subset of a topological space whose closure is the whole space
- Dense-in-itself — a subset $A$ of a topological space such that $A$ does not contain an isolated point
- Kripke semantics — a dense accessibility relation corresponds to the axiom $\Box\Box A \rightarrow \Box A$
