= Quasiregular element =

This article addresses the notion of quasiregularity in the context of ring theory, a branch of modern algebra. For other notions of quasiregularity in mathematics, see the disambiguation page quasiregular.

In mathematics, specifically ring theory, the notion of quasiregularity provides a computationally convenient way to work with the Jacobson radical of a ring. In this article, we primarily concern ourselves with the notion of quasiregularity for unital rings. However, one section is devoted to the theory of quasiregularity in non-unital rings, which constitutes an important aspect of noncommutative ring theory.

== Definition ==
Let R be a ring (with unity) and let r be an element of R. Then r is said to be quasiregular, if 1 − r is a unit in R; that is, invertible under multiplication. The notions of right or left quasiregularity correspond to the situations where 1 − r has a right or left inverse, respectively.

An element x of a non-unital ring R is said to be right quasiregular if there exists y in R such that $x + y - xy = 0$. The notion of a left quasiregular element is defined in an analogous manner. The element y is sometimes referred to as a right quasi-inverse of x. If the ring is unital, this definition of quasiregularity coincides with that given above. If one writes $x \cdot y = x + y - xy$, then this binary operation $\cdot$ is associative. In fact, in the unital case, the map $(R,\cdot)\to(R,\times); x\mapsto1-x$ (where × denotes the multiplication of the ring R) is a monoid isomorphism. Therefore, if an element possesses both a left and right quasi-inverse, they are equal.

Note that some authors use different definitions. They call an element x right quasiregular if there exists y such that $x + y + xy = 0$, which is equivalent to saying that 1 + x has a right inverse when the ring is unital. If we write $x\circ y=x+y+xy$, then $(-x)\circ(-y)=-(x\cdot y)$, so we can easily go from one set-up to the other by changing signs. For example, x is right quasiregular in one set-up if and only if −x is right quasiregular in the other set-up.

== Examples ==
- If R is a ring, then the additive identity of R is always quasiregular.
- If $x^2$ is right (resp. left) quasiregular, then $x$ is right (resp. left) quasiregular.
- If R is a ring, every nilpotent element of R is quasiregular. This fact is supported by an elementary computation:

If $x^{n+1} = 0$, then

$(1-x)(1 + x + x^2 + \dotsb + x^n) = 1$ (or $(1+x)(1-x+x^2-\dotsb+(-x)^n)=1$ if we follow the second convention).

From this we see easily that the quasi-inverse of x is $-x-x^2-\dotsb-x^n$ (or $-x+x^2-\dotsb+(-x)^n$).

- In the second convention, a matrix is quasiregular in a matrix ring if it does not possess −1 as an eigenvalue. More generally, a bounded operator is quasiregular if −1 is not in its spectrum.
- In a unital Banach algebra, if $\|x\| < 1$, then the geometric series $\sum_0^\infty x^n$ converges. Consequently, every such x is quasiregular.
- If R is a ring and S = R[[X_{1}, ..., X_{n}]] denotes the ring of formal power series in n indeterminants over R, an element of S is quasiregular if and only its constant term is quasiregular as an element of R.

== Properties ==
- Every element of the Jacobson radical of a (not necessarily commutative) ring is quasiregular. In fact, the Jacobson radical of a ring can be characterized as the unique right ideal of the ring, maximal with respect to the property that every element is right quasiregular. However, a right quasiregular element need not necessarily be a member of the Jacobson radical. This justifies the remark in the beginning of the article – "bad elements" are quasiregular, although quasiregular elements are not necessarily "bad". Elements of the Jacobson radical of a ring are often deemed to be "bad".
- If an element of a ring is nilpotent and central, then it is a member of the ring's Jacobson radical. This is because the principal right ideal generated by that element consists of quasiregular (in fact, nilpotent) elements only.
- If an element, r, of a ring is idempotent, it cannot be a member of the ring's Jacobson radical. This is because idempotent elements cannot be quasiregular. This property, as well as the one above, justify the remark given at the top of the article that the notion of quasiregularity is computationally convenient when working with the Jacobson radical.

== Generalization to semirings ==
The notion of quasiregular element readily generalizes to semirings. If a is an element of a semiring S, then an affine map from S to itself is $\mu_a(r) = ra + 1$. An element a of S is said to be right quasiregular if $\mu_a$ has a fixed point, which need not be unique. Each such fixed point is called a left quasi-inverse of a. If b is a left quasi-inverse of a and additionally b = ab + 1, then b it is called a quasi-inverse of a; any element of the semiring that has a quasi-inverse is said to be quasiregular. It is possible that some but not all elements of a semiring be quasiregular; for example, in the semiring of nonnegative reals with the usual addition and multiplication of reals, $\mu_a$ has the fixed point $\frac{1}{1-a}$ for all a < 1, but has no fixed point for a ≥ 1. If every element of a semiring is quasiregular then the semiring is called a quasi-regular semiring, closed semiring, or occasionally a Lehmann semiring (the latter honoring the paper of Daniel J. Lehmann.)

Examples of quasi-regular semirings are provided by the Kleene algebras (prominently among them, the algebra of regular expressions), in which the quasi-inverse is lifted to the role of a unary operation (denoted by a*) defined as the least fixedpoint solution. Kleene algebras are additively idempotent but not all quasi-regular semirings are so. We can extend the example of nonegative reals to include infinity and it becomes a quasi-regular semiring with the quasi-inverse of any element a ≥ 1 being the infinity. This quasi-regular semiring is not additively idempotent however, so it is not a Kleene algebra. It is however a complete semiring. More generally, all complete semirings are quasiregular. The term closed semiring is actually used by some authors to mean complete semiring rather than just quasiregular.

Conway semirings are also quasiregular; the two Conway axioms are actually independent, i.e. there are semirings satisfying only the product-star [Conway] axiom, (ab)* = 1+a(ba)*b, but not the sum-star axiom, (a+b)* = (a*b)*a* and vice versa; it is the product-star [Conway] axiom that implies that a semiring is quasiregular. Additionally, a commutative semiring is quasiregular if and only if it satisfies the product-star Conway axiom.

Quasiregular semirings appear in algebraic path problems, a generalization of the shortest path problem.

== See also ==
- inverse element
