= Matthew Hennessy =

Irish computer scientist

Matthew Hennessy is an Irish computer scientist who has contributed especially to concurrency, process calculi and programming language semantics.

== Career ==
During 1976–77, Matthew Hennessy was an assistant professor at the University of Waterloo in Canada. Then during 1977–78, he was a visiting professor at the Universidade Federal de Pernambuco in Brazil. Subsequently, he was a research associate (1979–81) and then lecturer (1981–85) at the University of Edinburgh in Scotland. During 1985, he was a guest lecturer/researcher at the University of Aarhus in Denmark.

Hennessy was Professor of Computer Science at the Department of Informatics, University of Sussex, England, from 1985 until 2008. Since then, Hennessy has held a research professorship at the Department of Computer Science, Trinity College, Dublin.

Hennessy's research interests are in the area of the semantic foundations of programming and specification languages, particularly involving distributed computing, including mobile computing. He also has an interest in verification tools. His co-authors include Robin Milner and Gordon Plotkin.

Hennessy is a member of the Academy of Europe. He held a Royal Society/Leverhulme Trust Senior Research Fellowship during 2005–06 and has a Science Foundation Ireland Research Professorship at Trinity College Dublin. In 2009, he was elected as a professorial fellow of Trinity College Dublin.

== Books ==
Matthew Hennessy has written a number of books:

- Hennessy, Matthew. A Distributed Pi-Calculus. Cambridge University Press, Cambridge, UK, 2007. ISBN 0-521-87330-4.
- Hennessy, Matthew. Algebraic Theory of Processes. The MIT Press, Cambridge, Massachusetts, 1988. ISBN 0-262-58093-4.
- Hennessy, Matthew. The Semantics of Programming Languages: An Elementary Introduction using Structural Operational Semantics. John Wiley and Sons, New York, 1990. ISBN 0-471-92772-4.

== See also ==
- Hennessy–Milner logic
- Ó hAonghusa
