= Konishi anomaly =

Symmetry breakdown in quantum supersymmetry

In theoretical physics, the Konishi anomaly is the violation of the conservation of the Noether current associated with certain transformations in theories with N=1 supersymmetry. More precisely, this transformation changes the phase of a chiral superfield. It shouldn't be confused with the R-symmetry that also depends on the fermionic superspace variables. The divergence of the corresponding Noether current for the Konishi transformation is nonzero but can be exactly expressed using the superpotential.

Konishi anomaly is named after its discoverer Kenichi Konishi, who is currently full professor of Theoretical Physics at the Physics Department E.Fermi of University of Pisa, Italy.
