= Regular element =

Regular element may refer to:

- In ring theory, a nonzero element of a ring that is neither a left nor a right zero divisor
- In ring theory, a von Neumann regular element of a ring
- A regular element of a Lie algebra or Lie group
