= Regular representation =

Representation theory of groups

In mathematics, and in particular the theory of group representations, the regular representation of a group G is the linear representation afforded by the group action of G on itself by translation.

One distinguishes the left regular representation λ given by left translation and the right regular representation ρ given by the inverse of right translation.

== Finite groups ==
For a finite group G, the left regular representation λ (over a field K) is a linear representation on the K-vector space V freely generated by the elements of G, i.e. elements of G can be identified with a basis of V. Given g ∈ G, λ_{g} is the linear map determined by its action on the basis by left translation by g, i.e.

$$\lambda_{g}:h\mapsto gh,\text{ for all }h\in G.$$

For the right regular representation ρ, an inversion must occur in order to satisfy the axioms of a representation. Specifically, given g ∈ G, ρ_{g} is the linear map on V determined by its action on the basis by right translation by g^{−1}, i.e.

$$\rho_{g}:h\mapsto hg^{-1},\text{ for all }h\in G.\$$

Alternatively, these representations can be defined on the K-vector space W of all functions G → K. It is in this form that the regular representation is generalized to topological groups such as Lie groups.

The specific definition in terms of W is as follows. Given a function f : G → K and an element g ∈ G,

$$(\lambda_{g}f)(x)=f(\lambda_{g}^{-1}(x))=f({g}^{-1}x)$$

and

$$(\rho_{g}f)(x)=f(\rho_{g}^{-1}(x))=f(xg).$$

== Significance of the regular representation of a group ==
Every group G acts on itself by translations. If we consider this action as a permutation representation it is characterised as having a single orbit and stabilizer the identity subgroup {e} of G. The regular representation of G, for a given field K, is the linear representation made by taking this permutation representation as a set of basis vectors of a vector space over K. The significance is that while the permutation representation doesn't decompose – it is transitive – the regular representation in general breaks up into smaller representations. For example, if G is a finite group and K is the complex number field, the regular representation decomposes as a direct sum of irreducible representations, with each irreducible representation appearing in the decomposition with multiplicity its dimension. The number of these irreducibles is equal to the number of conjugacy classes of G.

The above fact can be explained by character theory. Recall that the character of the regular representation χ(g) is the number of fixed points of g acting on the regular representation V. It means the number of fixed points χ(g) is zero when g is not id and |G| otherwise. Let V have the decomposition ⊕a_{i}V_{i} where V_{i}'s are irreducible representations of G and a_{i}'s are the corresponding multiplicities. By character theory, the multiplicity a_{i} can be computed as

$a_i= \langle \chi,\chi_i \rangle =\frac{1}{|G|}\sum \overline{\chi(g)}\chi_i(g)=\frac{1}{|G|}\chi(1)\chi_i(1)=\operatorname{dim} V_i,$ which means the multiplicity of each irreducible representation is its dimension.

The article on group rings articulates the regular representation for finite groups, as well as showing how the regular representation can be taken to be a module.

== Module theory point of view ==
To put the construction more abstractly, the group ring K[G] is considered as a module over itself. (There is a choice here of left-action or right-action, but that is not of importance except for notation.) If G is finite and the characteristic of K doesn't divide |G|, this is a semisimple ring and we are looking at its left (right) ring ideals. This theory has been studied in great depth. It is known in particular that the direct sum decomposition of the regular representation contains a representative of every isomorphism class of irreducible linear representations of G over K. You can say that the regular representation is comprehensive for representation theory, in this case. The modular case, when the characteristic of K does divide |G|, is harder mainly because with K[G] not semisimple, a representation can fail to be irreducible without splitting as a direct sum.

== Structure for finite cyclic groups ==
For a cyclic group C generated by g of order n, the matrix form of an element of K[C] acting on K[C] by multiplication takes a distinctive form known as a circulant matrix, in which each row is a shift to the right of the one above (in cyclic order, i.e. with the right-most element appearing on the left), when referred to the natural basis

1, g, g^{2}, ..., g^{n−1}.

When the field K contains a primitive n-th root of unity, one can diagonalise the representation of C by writing down n linearly independent simultaneous eigenvectors for all the n×n circulants. In fact if ζ is any n-th root of unity, the element

1 + ζg + ζ^{2}g^{2} + ... + ζ^{n−1}g^{n−1}

is an eigenvector for the action of g by multiplication, with eigenvalue

ζ^{−1}

and so also an eigenvector of all powers of g, and their linear combinations.

This is the explicit form in this case of the abstract result that over an algebraically closed field K (such as the complex numbers) the regular representation of G is completely reducible, provided that the characteristic of K (if it is a prime number p) doesn't divide the order of G. That is called Maschke's theorem. In this case the condition on the characteristic is implied by the existence of a primitive n-th root of unity, which cannot happen in the case of prime characteristic p dividing n.

Circulant determinants were first encountered in nineteenth century mathematics, and the consequence of their diagonalisation drawn. Namely, the determinant of a circulant is the product of the n eigenvalues for the n eigenvectors described above. The basic work of Frobenius on group representations started with the motivation of finding analogous factorisations of the group determinants for any finite G; that is, the determinants of arbitrary matrices representing elements of K[G] acting by multiplication on the basis elements given by g in G. Unless G is abelian, the factorisation must contain non-linear factors corresponding to irreducible representations of G of degree > 1.

== Topological group case ==
For a topological group G, the regular representation in the above sense should be replaced by a suitable space of functions on G, with G acting by translation. See Peter–Weyl theorem for the compact case. If G is a Lie group but not compact nor abelian, this is a difficult matter of harmonic analysis. The locally compact abelian case is part of the Pontryagin duality theory.

== Normal bases in Galois theory ==
In Galois theory it is shown that for a field L, and a finite group G of automorphisms of L, the fixed field K of G has [L:K] = |G|. In fact we can say more: L viewed as a K[G]-module is the regular representation. This is the content of the normal basis theorem, a normal basis being an element x of L such that the g(x) for g in G are a vector space basis for L over K. Such x exist, and each one gives a K[G]-isomorphism from L to K[G]. From the point of view of algebraic number theory it is of interest to study normal integral bases, where we try to replace L and K by the rings of algebraic integers they contain. One can see already in the case of the Gaussian integers that such bases may not exist: a + bi and a − bi can never form a Z-module basis of Z[i] because 1 cannot be an integer combination. The reasons are studied in depth in Galois module theory.

== More general algebras ==
The regular representation of a group ring is such that the left-hand and right-hand regular representations give isomorphic modules (and we often need not distinguish the cases). Given an algebra over a field A, it doesn't immediately make sense to ask about the relation between A as left-module over itself, and as right-module. In the group case, the mapping on basis elements g of K[G] defined by taking the inverse element gives an isomorphism of K[G] to its opposite ring. For A general, such a structure is called a Frobenius algebra. As the name implies, these were introduced by Frobenius in the nineteenth century. They have been shown to be related to topological quantum field theory in 1 + 1 dimensions by a particular instance of the cobordism hypothesis.

== See also ==
- Fundamental representation
- Permutation representation
- Quasiregular representation
