= Irregular =

Irregular, irregulars or irregularity may refer to any of the following:

== Astronomy ==
- Irregular galaxy
- Irregular moon
- Irregular variable, a kind of star

== Language ==
- Irregular inflection, the formation of derived forms such as plurals in unpredictable ways
  - Irregular verb

== Law ==
- Against regulations
- In canon law, an irregularity is an impediment for the Catholic priesthood or for exercising orders already received

== Mathematics ==
- Irregularity of a surface
- Irregularity of distributions
- Irregularity index

== Medicine ==
- Irregular bone
- Arrhythmia, also known as an irregular heartbeat
- Constipation, also called "irregularity"

== Other ==
- The Irregulars, a 2021 Netflix series
- Accounting irregularity
- Irregular military
- Irregular chess opening

== See also ==
- Anomaly (disambiguation)
- Baker Street Irregulars
- Regular (disambiguation)
