= Anomalon =

Hypothetical nuclear matter with large cross section

In physics, an anomalon is a hypothetical type of nuclear matter that shows an anomalously large reactive cross section. They were first noticed in experimental runs in the early 1980s as short tracks in film emulsions or plastic leaf detectors connected to medium-energy particle accelerators. The direction of the tracks demonstrated that they were the results of reactions taking place within the accelerator targets, but they stopped so quickly in the detectors that no obvious explanation for their behavior could be offered. A flurry of theoretical explanations followed, but over time a series of follow-up experiments failed to find strong evidence for the anomalons, and active study of the topic largely ended by the late 1980s.

== Description ==
Early particle accelerators generally consisted of three parts, the accelerator, a metal target, and some sort of detector. Detectors differed depending on the reactions being studied, but one class of inexpensive and useful detectors consisted of a large volume of photographic emulsion, often on individual plates, that would capture the particles as they moved through the stack. As the high-energy community moved to larger accelerators and exotic particles and reactions, new detectors were introduced that worked on different principles. The film technique remains in use today in certain fields; small versions can be flown on balloons, while larger versions can be placed in mines, both in order to capture rare but extremely high-energy cosmic rays.

By the late 1970s and early 1980s a generation of accelerators had been made obsolete by newer machines in terms of being useful for leading edge research. Still useful for other tasks, these older machines were turned to a wide variety of new studies. One particularly active area of research is collisions between higher mass particles, instead of fundamental particles like electrons or protons. Although the total energy of the reaction is the same, or lower, than it would be using lighter elementary particles, using heavier elements increases the number of products from the reactions, revealing low-frequency reactions that might otherwise go unnoticed. Noble gasses are particularly useful for these experiments because they are easy to handle, unreactive and relatively inexpensive.

One such experiment was being carried out on the Bevalac at the Lawrence Berkeley National Laboratory using Argon 40 accelerated to 1.8 GeV and then smashed into a copper target backed with a nuclear emulsion detector. It was here that the anomalons were first observed. While studying the results of these experiments, a number of very short tracks were discovered, penetrating only a short distance into the emulsion. The vast majority of the particles continued into the emulsion over much greater distances, in keeping with expectations and the results of all previous experiments on the machine. The tracks did not appear to be from outside sources like cosmic rays. Further studies were carried out with Oxygen 16 and Iron 56, and these experiments also showed the same short tracks.

In order for the particles to stop so quickly within the emulsion, they would either have to have low energies, and thus be moving slowly, be extremely massive, and thus have high energy but still move slowly, or they were reacting with the emulsion itself and turning into other particles. The first possibility, that they were low-energy particles, did not seem likely given the physics of the accelerator. The second, that they were high mass, was contradicted by other measurements that suggested the particles had a charge of 14, like silicon, and would thus very likely have a low mass. This left only the third possibility, that they were reacting with the emulsion itself. This was by no means uncommon; these reactions were used as an integral part of the detection process, but it was the speed at which these reactions would have to take place that was odd. In order to produce such short tracks, the particles would have to be reacting much more quickly than ever seen before. The particles became known as "anomalons" due to their apparently anomalous reaction rates. If they were following the same basic rules as other matter, and interacting with the emulsion due to the strong force, their component of the strong force was about ten times the strength of known reactions.

A series of experiments followed, attempting to duplicate the results. Many of these used an alternate detector system using thin sheets of plastic, and these failed to turn up any evidence of the anomalons. It was suggested that this was due to the cross section of the reaction, whatever it was, being much higher in higher-mass nuclei, which was the case for the emulsion detectors but not the plastic. Others suggested they were actually seeing quark-gluon soups for the first time. A workshop on the issue was held at LBNL in 1984.

However, as study continued the number of negative results continued to grow. By 1987 interest in the topic had waned, and most research in the field ended. However, some research continued and in 1998 Piyare Jain claimed to have finally demonstrated them conclusively, using larger accelerators at Brookhaven National Laboratory and CERN and combining that with a thin detector which he claimed was key to the problem of detecting the anomalons. More recently he has claimed that the particles in question are actually the elusive axion, long thought to be part of the Standard Model, but unseen in spite of decades of searching.
