= Regular set =

Regular set may refer to:

- Free regular set
- Closed regular set
- μ-regular set
- set in a theory of sets with an axiom of regularity
