= Quasiregular representation =

In mathematics, quasiregular representation is a concept of representation theory, for a locally compact group G and a homogeneous space G/H where H is a closed subgroup.

In line with the concepts of regular representation and induced representation, G acts on functions on G/H. If however Haar measures give rise only to a quasi-invariant measure on G/H, certain 'correction factors' have to be made to the action on functions, for

L^{2}(G/H)

to afford a unitary representation of G on square-integrable functions. With appropriate scaling factors, therefore, introduced into the action of G, this is the quasiregular representation or modified induced representation.
