= Permutation representation =

In mathematics, the term permutation representation of a (typically finite) group $G$ can refer to either of two closely related notions: a representation of $G$ as a group of permutations, or as a group of permutation matrices. The term also refers to the combination of the two.

== Abstract permutation representation ==
A permutation representation of a group $G$ on a set $X$ is a homomorphism from $G$ to the symmetric group of $X$:

$$\rho\colon G \to \operatorname{Sym}(X).$$

The image $\rho(G)\sub \operatorname{Sym}(X)$ is a permutation group and the elements of $G$ are represented as permutations of $X$. A permutation representation is equivalent to an action of $G$ on the set $X$:

$$G\times X \to X.$$

See the article on group action for further details.

== Linear permutation representation ==
If $G$ is a permutation group of degree $n$, then the permutation representation of $G$ is the linear representation of $G$

$$\rho\colon G\to \operatorname{GL}_n(K)$$

which maps $g\in G$ to the corresponding permutation matrix (here $K$ is an arbitrary field). That is, $G$ acts on $K^n$ by permuting the standard basis vectors.

This notion of a permutation representation can, of course, be composed with the previous one to represent an arbitrary abstract group $G$ as a group of permutation matrices. One first represents $G$ as a permutation group and then maps each permutation to the corresponding matrix. Representing $G$ as a permutation group acting on itself by translation, one obtains the regular representation.

== Character of the permutation representation ==
Given a group $G$ and a finite set $X$ with $G$ acting on the set $X$ then the character $\chi$ of the permutation representation is exactly the number of fixed points of $X$ under the action of $\rho(g)$ on $X$. That is $\chi(g)=$ the number of points of $X$ fixed by $\rho(g)$.

This follows since, if we represent the map $\rho(g)$ with a matrix with basis defined by the elements of $X$ we get a permutation matrix of $X$. Now the character of this representation is defined as the trace of this permutation matrix. An element on the diagonal of a permutation matrix is 1 if the point in $X$ is fixed, and 0 otherwise. So we can conclude that the trace of the permutation matrix is exactly equal to the number of fixed points of $X$.

For example, if $G=S_3$ and $X=\{1, 2, 3\}$ the character of the permutation representation can be computed with the formula $\chi(g)=$ the number of points of $X$ fixed by $g$. So

$$\chi((12))=\operatorname{tr}(\begin{bmatrix} 0 & 1 & 0\\ 1 & 0 & 0\\ 0 & 0 & 1\end{bmatrix})=1$$
as only 3 is fixed
$$\chi((123))=\operatorname{tr}(\begin{bmatrix} 0 & 1 & 0\\ 0 & 0 & 1\\ 1 & 0 & 0\end{bmatrix})=0$$
as no elements of $X$ are fixed, and
$$\chi(1)=\operatorname{tr}(\begin{bmatrix} 1 & 0 & 0\\ 0 & 1 & 0\\ 0 & 0 & 1\end{bmatrix})=3$$
as every element of $X$ is fixed.

== See also ==
- Cayley's theorem, which shows all groups have a regular permutation representation
