= Dexter Kozen =

American computer scientist

- Born: December 20, 1951 (age 74); United States
- Education: Dartmouth College (BA, 1974), Cornell University (PhD, 1977)
- Known for: Dynamic logic (modal logic), Automata theory, Kleene algebra with tests
- Spouse: Frances Kozen
- Scientific career
- Fields: Theoretical computer science
- Workplaces: Cornell University (1985–), Radboud University Nijmegen (2014)
- Thesis: Complexity of Finitely Presented Algebras (1977)
- Doctoral advisor: Juris Hartmanis
- Website: https://www.cs.cornell.edu/~kozen/

Dexter Campbell Kozen (born December 20, 1951) is an American theoretical computer scientist. He is Professor Emeritus and Joseph Newton Pew, Jr. Professor in Engineering at Cornell University.

== Career ==
Kozen received his BA in mathematics from Dartmouth College in 1974 and his PhD in computer science in 1977 from Cornell University, where he was advised by Juris Hartmanis on the thesis, Complexity of Finitely Presented Algebras.

He is known for his work at the intersection of logic and complexity. He is one of the fathers of dynamic logic and developed the version of the modal μ-calculus most used today. His work on Kleene algebra with tests was recognized with an Alonzo Church Award in 2022. Moreover, he has written several textbooks on the theory of computation, automata theory, dynamic logic, and algorithms.

Kozen was a guitarist, singer, and songwriter in the band "Harmful if Swallowed". He also holds the position of faculty advisor for Cornell's rugby football club.

== Awards and honors ==
- John G. Kemeny Prize in Computing, Dartmouth College (1974)
- Outstanding Innovation Award, IBM Corporation (1974)
- Fellow, John Simon Guggenheim Foundation (1991)
- Stephen and Margery Russell Distinguished Teaching Award, College of Arts and Sciences, Cornell (2001)
- ACM Fellow, for contributions to theoretical computer science (2003)
- Fellow, AAAS (2008)
- 2001 LICS Test-of-Time Award for the paper "A completeness theorem for Kleene algebras and the algebra of regular events" (2011)
- Faculty of the Year, ACSU (Association of Computer Science Undergraduates at Cornell) (2013)
- Radboud Excellence professorship at the Radboud University Nijmegen (2014)
- Fellow, EATCS (2015)
- EATCS Distinguished Achievements Award (2016)
- McDowell Award, for groundbreaking contributions to topics ranging from computational complexity to the analysis of algebraic computations to logics of programs and verification (2016)
- Weiss Presidential Fellow (2018)
- POPL Distinguished Paper Award for the paper "Guarded Kleene algebra with tests: verification of uninterpreted programs in nearly linear time" (2020)
- Alonzo Church Award, for his fundamental work on developing the theory and applications of Kleene Algebra with Tests, an equational system for reasoning about iterative programs, published in the paper "Kleene algebra with tests" (2022)
- OOPSLA Distinguished Paper Award for the paper "Formal abstractions for packet scheduling" (2023)
