= Richard Laver =

American mathematician

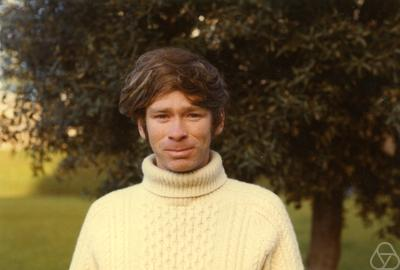
Richard Laver

Richard Joseph Laver (October 20, 1942 – September 19, 2012) was an American mathematician, working in set theory.

== Biography ==
Laver received his PhD at the University of California, Berkeley in 1969, under the supervision of Ralph McKenzie, with a thesis on Order Types and Well-Quasi-Orderings. The largest part of his career he spent as Professor and later Emeritus Professor at the University of Colorado at Boulder.

Richard Laver died in Boulder, CO, on September 19, 2012 after a long illness.

== Research contributions ==
Among Laver's notable achievements some are the following.

- Using the theory of better-quasi-orders, introduced by Nash-Williams, (an extension of the notion of well-quasi-ordering), he proved Fraïssé's conjecture (now Laver's theorem): if (A_{0},≤),(A_{1},≤),...,(A_{i},≤), are countable ordered sets, then for some i<j (A_{i},≤) isomorphically embeds into (A_{j},≤). This also holds if the ordered sets are countable unions of scattered ordered sets.
- He proved the consistency of the Borel conjecture, i.e., the statement that every strong measure zero set is countable. This important independence result was the first when a forcing (see Laver forcing), adding a real, was iterated with countable support iteration. This method was later used by Shelah to introduce proper and semiproper forcing.
- He proved the existence of a Laver function for supercompact cardinals. With the help of this, he proved the following result. If κ is supercompact, there is a κ-c.c. forcing notion (P, ≤) such that after forcing with (P, ≤) the following holds: κ is supercompact and remains supercompact in any forcing extension via a κ-directed closed forcing. This statement, known as the indestructibility result, is used, for example, in the proof of the consistency of the proper forcing axiom and variants.
- Laver and Shelah proved that it is consistent that the continuum hypothesis holds and there are no ℵ_{2}-Suslin trees.
- Laver proved that the perfect subtree version of the Halpern–Läuchli theorem holds for the product of infinitely many trees. This solved a longstanding open question.
- Laver started investigating the algebra that j generates where j:V_{λ}→V_{λ} is some elementary embedding. This algebra is the free left-distributive algebra on one generator. For this he introduced Laver tables.
- He also showed that if V[G] is a (set-)forcing extension of V, then V is a class in V[G].
