= Thomas Forster (mathematician) =

British set theorist and philosopher (born 1948)

Dr Thomas Forster
- Born: 12 April 1948 (age 78)
- Education: Cambridge
- Scientific career
- Workplaces: DPMMS, Cambridge
- Thesis: NF (1977)
- Doctoral advisor: Adrian Mathias, Maurice Boffa

Thomas Edward Forster (born 12 April 1948) is a British set theorist and philosopher. His work has focused on Quine's New Foundations, the theory of well-quasi-orders and better-quasi-orders, and various topics in philosophy.

== Career ==
Forster completed a PhD at the University of Cambridge in 1977, with the dissertation NF on New Foundations, jointly supervised by Adrian Mathias and Maurice Boffa.

Forster is an Affiliated Lecturer at DPMMS, Cambridge, a Bye-Fellow at Queens' College, and holds honorary appointments for many other organisations worldwide, including the Center for Philosophy of Science in Pittsburgh, the Centre National de Recherches de Logique in Belgium, and the Centre for Discrete Mathematics and Theoretical Computer Science at the University of Auckland. Amongst his undergraduate supervisees are Phebe Mann, Rosi Sexton, Richard Taylor, Rebecca Kitteridge, Doug Gurr, Sarah Flannery and Ursula Martin.

== Recognition ==
Forster was awarded the J.T. Knight Prize as a PhD student at Cambridge in 1974. His article "The Iterative Conception of Set" was recognised by the Philosophers' Annual as one of the ten best philosophy articles of 2008.

== Books ==
Forster's books include:

- Quine's New Foundations: An Introduction (Cabay, 1983)
- Set Theory with a Universal Set: Exploring an Untyped Universe (Clarendon, 1992; 2nd ed., 1996)
- Reasoning about Theoretical Entities (World Scientific, 2003)
- Logic, Induction and Sets (Cambridge University Press, 2003)
