= BQO =

BQO may refer to:

- Better-quasi-ordering, a mathematical relation
- Balo language (by 639-3 language code)
- Tehini Airport (by IATA airport code)
