= Monica VanDieren =

American mathematician

Monica M. VanDieren is an American mathematician specializing in mathematical logic and model theory. She is University Professor of Mathematics and Director of the University Honors Program at Robert Morris University.

== Education and career ==
VanDieren graduated from the University of Illinois at Urbana–Champaign in 1996, with a bachelor's degree in mathematics. She did her graduate studies in mathematical sciences at Carnegie Mellon University through their Pure & Applied Logic Program, earning a master's degree in 1998 and completing her Ph.D. in 2002. Her dissertation was Categoricity and Stability in Abstract Elementary Classes, with Rami Grossberg as her doctoral advisor.

After completing her doctorate, she was a Szegö Assistant Professor of Mathematics at Stanford University for 2002–2003, and then T. H. Hildebrandt Assistant Professor of Mathematics at the University of Michigan from 2003 to 2006, before joining the Robert Morris University mathematics department in 2006. She was promoted to full professor in 2012 and University Professor in 2016; she was co-director of the University Honors Program from 2008 to 2018 and director from 2018 to 2022. In August 2022, she joined IBM's Quantum Industry and Technical Services.

== Contributions ==
Some of VanDieren's research has been directed towards Shelah's categoricity conjecture in classification theory.

Beyond VanDieren's university work, she has also led mathematics enrichment workshops for middle school and high school students, for instance using origami to demonstrate the beauty of mathematics.

== Personal life ==
VanDieren is married to Rami Grossberg.
