= Tame abstract elementary class =

In model theory, a discipline within the field of mathematical logic, a tame abstract elementary class is an abstract elementary class (AEC) which satisfies a locality property for types called tameness. Even though it appears implicitly in earlier work of Shelah, tameness as a property of AEC was first isolated by Grossberg and VanDieren, who observed that tame AECs were much easier to handle than general AECs.

== Definition ==
Let K be an AEC with joint embedding, amalgamation, and no maximal models. Just like in first-order model theory, this implies K has a universal model-homogeneous monster model $\mathfrak{C}$. Working inside $\mathfrak{C}$, we can define a semantic notion of types by specifying that two elements a and b have the same type over some base model $M$ if there is an automorphism of the monster model sending a to b fixing $M$ pointwise (note that types can be defined in a similar manner without using a monster model). Such types are called Galois types.

One can ask for such types to be determined by their restriction on a small domain. This gives rise to the notion of tameness:

- An AEC $K$ is tame if there exists a cardinal $\kappa$ such that any two distinct Galois types are already distinct on a submodel of their domain of size $\le \kappa$. When we want to emphasize $\kappa$, we say $K$ is $\kappa$-tame.

Tame AECs are usually also assumed to satisfy amalgamation.

== Discussion and motivation ==
While (without the existence of large cardinals) there are examples of non-tame AECs, most of the known natural examples are tame. In addition, the following sufficient conditions for a class to be tame are known:

- Tameness is a large cardinal axiom: There are class-many almost strongly compact cardinals if and only if any abstract elementary class is tame.
- Some tameness follows from categoricity: If an AEC with amalgamation is categorical in a cardinal $\lambda$ of high-enough cofinality, then tameness holds for types over saturated models of size less than $\lambda$.
- Conjecture 1.5 in : If K is categorical in some λ ≥ Hanf(K) then there exists χ < Hanf(K) such that K is χ-tame.

Many results in the model theory of (general) AECs assume weak forms of the Generalized continuum hypothesis and rely on sophisticated combinatorial set-theoretic arguments. On the other hand, the model theory of tame AECs is much easier to develop, as evidenced by the results presented below.

== Results ==
The following are some important results about tame AECs.

- Upward categoricity transfer: A $\kappa$-tame AEC with amalgamation that is categorical in some successor $\lambda \ge \operatorname{LS}(K)^{++} + \kappa^+$ (i.e. has exactly one model of size $\lambda$ up to isomorphism) is categorical in all $\mu \ge \lambda$.
- Upward stability transfer: A $\kappa$-tame AEC with amalgamation that is stable in a cardinal $\lambda \ge \kappa$ is stable in $\lambda^+$ and in every infinite $\mu$ such that $\mu^\lambda = \mu$.
- Tameness can be seen as a topological separation principle: An AEC with amalgamation is tame if and only if an appropriate topology on the set of Galois types is Hausdorff.
- Tameness and categoricity imply there is a forking notion: A $\kappa$-tame AEC with amalgamation that is categorical in a cardinal $\lambda$ of cofinality greater than or equal to $\kappa$ has a good frame: a forking-like notion for types of singletons (in particular, it is stable in all cardinals). This gives rise to a well-behaved notion of dimension.
