= Maya Ackerman =

Russian-American computer scientist

Ackerman in 2026

Margareta Ackerman is a Belarusian-American computer scientist known for her research in cluster analysis and algorithmic composition of music. She is an assistant professor of computer science and engineering at Santa Clara University, and the founder and CEO of algorithmic music firm WaveAI.

== Early life and education ==
Ackerman was born in Gomel, USSR. She moved with her family to Afula, Israel in 1990, when she was seven years old, and five years later moved again to Canada. She was a student of computer science at the University of Waterloo, earning a bachelor's degree in 2006, master's degree in 2007, and Ph.D. in 2012. Her dissertation, supervised by Shai Ben-David, was Towards Theoretical Foundations of Clustering.

== Academic career ==
After postdoctoral research at the California Institute of Technology and the University of California, San Diego, Ackerman joined the faculty of Florida State University in 2014. She moved to San Jose State University in 2016, and to Santa Clara University in 2017.

== Contributions ==
Ackerman is the co-creator of ALYSIA, an artificially intelligent system for creating pop music tunes. She founded the company WaveAI in 2017 to commercialize this technology. In 2020, Ackerman was named one of the Silicon Valley Business Journal's Women of Influence.

She is also the author of Running from Giants: The Holocaust Through the Eyes of a Child, a self-published book about her grandfather, a Polish-born holocaust survivor.
