= Reverse Mathematics: Proofs from the Inside Out =

Book by John Stillwell

- First edition
- Author: John Stillwell
- Language: English
- Genre: Mathematics
- Publisher: Princeton University Press
- Publication date: 2018

Reverse Mathematics: Proofs from the Inside Out is a book by John Stillwell on reverse mathematics, the process of examining proofs in mathematics to determine which axioms are required by the proof. It was published in 2018 by the Princeton University Press.

== Topics ==
The book begins with a historical overview of the long struggles with the parallel postulate in Euclidean geometry, and of the foundational crisis of the late 19th and early 20th centuries, Then, after reviewing background material in real analysis and computability theory, the book concentrates on the reverse mathematics of theorems in real analysis, including the Bolzano–Weierstrass theorem, the Heine–Borel theorem, the intermediate value theorem and extreme value theorem, the Heine–Cantor theorem on uniform continuity, the Hahn–Banach theorem, and the Riemann mapping theorem. These theorems are analyzed with respect to three of the "big five" subsystems of second-order arithmetic, namely arithmetical comprehension, recursive comprehension, and the weak Kőnig's lemma.

== Audience ==
The book is aimed at a "general mathematical audience" including undergraduate mathematics students with an introductory-level background in real analysis. It is intended both to excite mathematicians, physicists, and computer scientists about the foundational issues in their fields, and to provide an accessible introduction to the subject. However, it is not a textbook; for instance, it has no exercises. One theme of the book is that many theorems in this area require axioms in second-order arithmetic that encompass infinite processes and uncomputable functions.

== Reception and related reading ==
Jeffry Hirst criticizes the book, writing that "if one is not too obsessive about the details, Proofs from the Inside Out is an interesting introduction," while finding details that he would prefer to be handled differently, in a topic for which details are important. In particular, in this area, there are multiple choices for how to build up the arithmetic on real numbers from simpler data types such as the natural numbers, and while Stillwell discusses three of them (decimal numerals, Dedekind cuts, and nested intervals), converting between them itself requires nontrivial axiomatic assumptions.

However, James Case calls the book "very readable", and Roman Kossak calls it "a stellar example of expository writing on mathematics". Several other reviewers agree that this book could be helpful as a non-technical way to create interest in this topic in mathematicians who are not already familiar with it, and lead them to more in-depth material in this area.

As additional reading on reverse mathematics in combinatorics, Hirst suggests Slicing the Truth by Denis Hirschfeldt. Another book suggested by reviewer Reinhard Kahle is Stephen G. Simpson's Subsystems of Second Order Arithmetic.
