= David Joyce =

David Joyce may refer to:

- David Joyce (businessman) (1825–1894), American lumber baron and industrialist in the 1800s
- David Joyce (politician) (born 1957), American politician and U.S. Representative from Ohio
- David C. Joyce, president of Brevard College, North Carolina
- David E. Joyce, American mathematician
- David Oliver Joyce (born 1987), Irish boxer
- Dominic Joyce (born 1968), British mathematician also called David Joyce

== See also ==
- David Burgess-Joyce (born 1964), British politician
