= Rami Grossberg =

American mathematician

- רמי גרוסברג
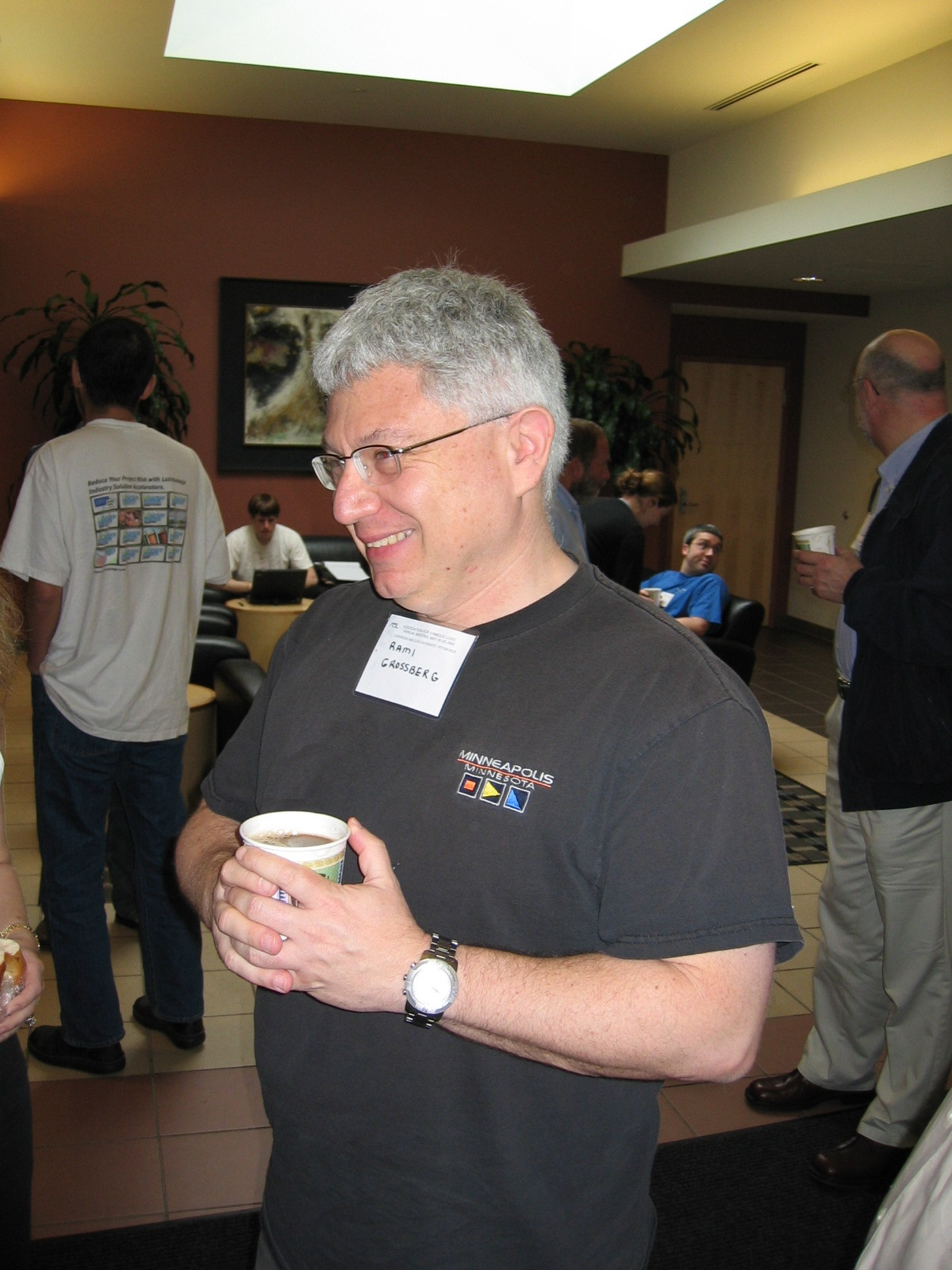
- Grossberg in 2004
- Occupation: Professor

Academic background
- Education: Hebrew University of Jerusalem Ph.D. (1986)
- Doctoral advisor: Saharon Shelah

Academic work
- Discipline: Mathematics
- Sub-discipline: Model theory
- Institutions: Carnegie Mellon University
- Doctoral students: Olivier Lessmann; Monica VanDieren; Alexei Kolesnikov; Will Boney; Sebastien Vasey; Marcos Mazari-Armida; Hanif J. Cheung; Samson Leung; Wentao Yang

Rami Grossberg (Hebrew: רמי גרוסברג) is a full professor of mathematics at Carnegie Mellon University. He works in model theory.

== Mathematical Work ==
Grossberg's work revolves around the development of a model-theory for classes that cannot be axiomatized by first-order sentences. His early work includes:

- (with Shelah) Finding that under the weak continuum hypothesis there is no universal object in the class of uncountable locally finite groups.
- Generalizing the Keisler–Shelah omitting types theorem for $\mathit{L(Q)}$ (first-order logic with the quantifier "there exists uncountably many") to successors of singular cardinals.
- (with Hart) proving a structure theorem for $\mathit{L}_{\omega_1,\omega}$ (first-order logic, but with countably infinite conjunctions and disjunctions), which resolves Morley's spectrum problem for the so-called "excellent" classes.
- (with Shelah), showing that there is a jump in cardinality of the abelian group $\text{Ext}_p(G, \mathbf{Z})$ at the first singular strong limit cardinal.

Grossberg later work focuses on Abstract elementary classes, a framework for model theory of non first-order classes that encompasses many infinitary logics as a special case (including the aforementioned $\mathit{L}_{\omega_1,\omega}$ and $\mathit{L}(Q)$). While the definition of the framework is due to Shelah, Grossberg wrote the first expository paper on the topic. The paper gives the definition of these classes, proves many key facts, and lists open problems. As of 2026, it has become Grossberg's most cited paper.

In joint work with Monica VanDieren, he gives a proof of an "upward" Morley's Categoricity Theorem for Abstract Elementary Classes with the amalgamation property, that are tame.

The tameness property used in the paper has turned into an independent notion of interest. It has led for example to new understanding of the notion of forking in the abstract elementary class setting. The research program on tameness remains active. A joint work with Sebastien Vasey proves for examples that numerous candidate definitions of superstability are all equivalent in the tame context. This gives evidence that sizable fragments of classification theory generalize well to the abstract elementary class framework.

Grossberg's students have written more than 60 papers under his guidance, mostly on abstract elementary classes.
