= Morass =

Morass may refer to:

- Marsh, a wetland
- Morass (set theory), an infinite combinatorial structure
- The Morass, former name of Inundation, Gibraltar
- Palais Morass, a historic building in Heidelberg, Germany, which houses the Kurpfälzisches Museum
- Morass (film), a 1922 German silent film
