= Morass (set theory) =

Mathematical concept

In axiomatic set theory, a mathematical discipline, a morass is an infinite combinatorial structure, used to create "large" structures from a "small" number of "small" approximations. They were invented by Ronald Jensen for his proof that cardinal transfer theorems hold under the axiom of constructibility. A far less complex but equivalent variant known as a simplified morass was introduced by Velleman, and the term morass is now often used to mean these simpler structures.

== Overview ==
Whilst it is possible to define so-called gap-n morasses for n > 1, they are so complex that focus is usually restricted to the gap-1 case, except for specific applications. The "gap" is essentially the cardinal difference between the size of the "small approximations" used and the size of the ultimate structure.

A (gap-1) morass on an uncountable regular cardinal κ (also called a (κ,1)-morass) consists of a tree of height κ + 1, with the top level having κ^{+}-many nodes. The nodes are taken to be ordinals, and functions π between these ordinals are associated to the edges in the tree order. It is required that the ordinal structure of the top level nodes be "built up" as the direct limit of the ordinals in the branch to that node by the maps π, so the lower level nodes can be thought of as approximations to the (larger) top level node. A long list of further axioms is imposed to have this happen in a particularly "nice" way.

== Variants and equivalents ==
Velleman and Shelah and Stanley independently developed forcing axioms equivalent to the existence of morasses, to facilitate their use by non-experts. Going further, Velleman showed that the existence of morasses is equivalent to simplified morasses, which are vastly simpler structures. However, the only known construction of a simplified morass in Gödel's constructible universe is by means of morasses, so the original notion retains interest.

Other variants on morasses, generally with added structure, have also appeared over the years. These include universal morasses, whereby every subset of κ is built up through the branches of the morass, mangroves, which are morasses stratified into levels (mangals) at which every branch must have a node, and quagmires.

== Simplified morass ==
Velleman defined gap-1 simplified morasses which are much simpler than gap-1 morasses, and showed that the existence of gap-1 morasses is equivalent to the existence of gap-1 simplified morasses.

Roughly speaking: a (κ,1)-simplified morass M = < φ^{→}, F^{⇒} > contains a sequence φ^{→} = < φ_{β} : β ≤ κ > of ordinals such that φ_{β} < κ for β < κ and φ_{κ} = κ^{+}, and a double sequence F^{⇒} = < F_{α,β} : α < β ≤ κ > where F_{α,β} are collections of monotone mappings from φ_{α} to φ_{β} for α < β ≤ κ with specific (easy but important) conditions.

Velleman's clear definition can be found in, where he also constructed (ω_{0},1) simplified morasses in ZFC. In he gave similar simple definitions for gap-2 simplified morasses, and in he constructed (ω_{0},2) simplified morasses in ZFC.

Higher gap simplified morasses for any n ≥ 1 were defined by Morgan and Szalkai.

Roughly speaking: a (κ,n + 1)-simplified morass (of Szalkai) M = < M^{→}, F^{⇒} > contains a sequence M^{→} = < M_{β} : β ≤ κ > of (< κ,n)-simplified morass-like structures for β < κ and M_{κ} a (κ^{+},n) -simplified morass, and a double sequence F^{⇒} = < F_{α,β} : α < β ≤ κ > where F_{α,β} are collections of mappings from M_{α} to M_{β} for α < β ≤ κ with specific conditions.
