= Ronald Jensen =

American mathematician (1936–2025)

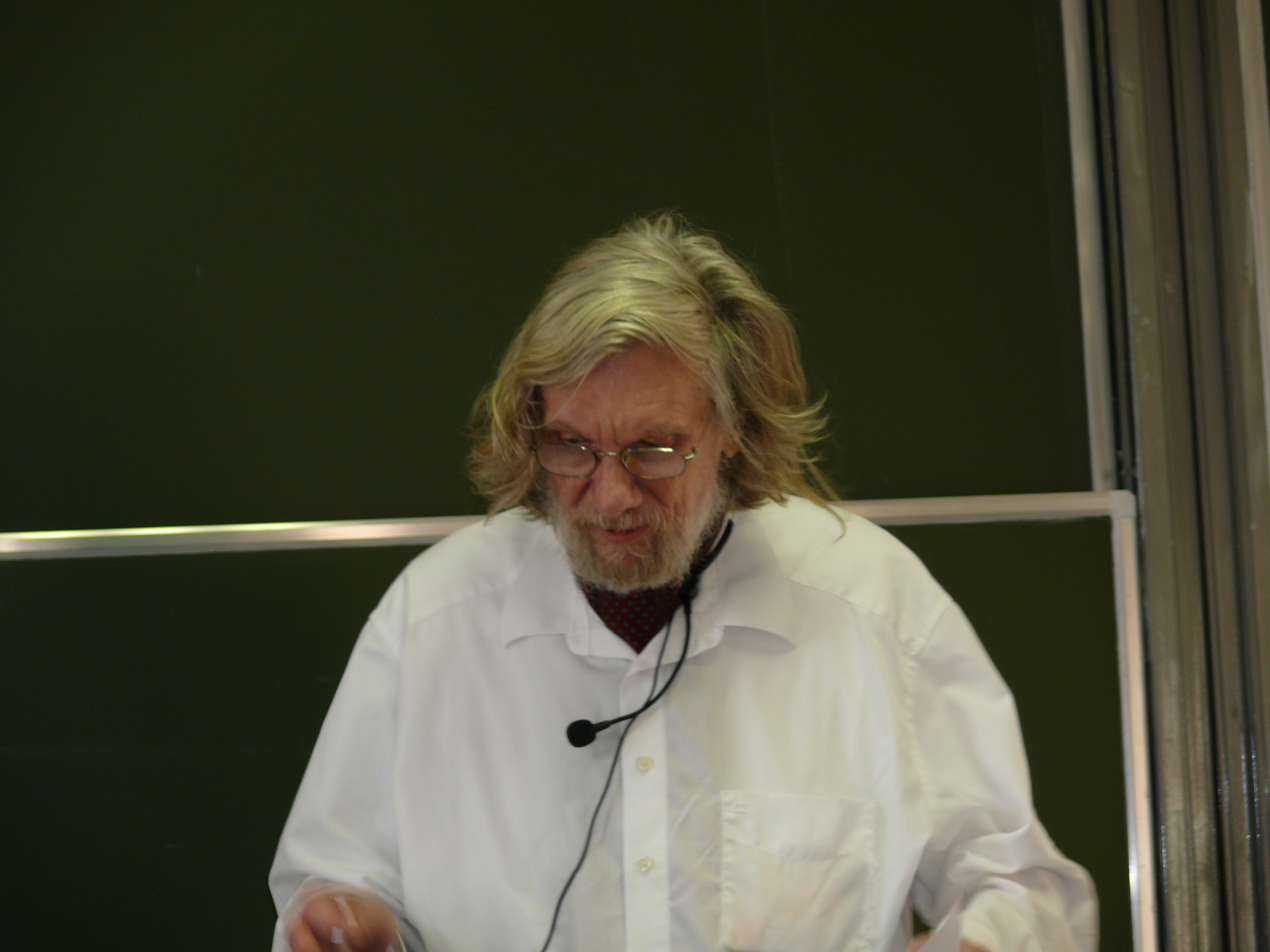
- Jensen giving a lecture in 2007
- Born: Ronald Björn Jensen; April 1, 1936; Charlottesville, Virginia, U.S.
- Died: September 16, 2025 (aged 89); Berlin, Germany
- Education: University of Bonn
- Known for: NFU
- Scientific career
- Fields: Mathematics (axiomatic set theory, mathematical logic)
- Workplaces: University of Berlin
- Doctoral advisor: Gisbert Hasenjaeger
- Doctoral students: Oliver Deiser; Benedikt Löwe; Adrian Mathias

Ronald Björn Jensen (April 1, 1936 – September 16, 2025) was an American mathematician who lived in Germany, primarily known for his work in mathematical logic and set theory.

== Life and career ==
Jensen completed a BA in economics at American University in 1959, and a Ph.D. in mathematics at the University of Bonn in 1964. His supervisor was Gisbert Hasenjaeger.

Jensen taught at Rockefeller University, 1969–71, and the University of California, Berkeley, 1971–73. The balance of his academic career was spent in Europe at the University of Bonn, the University of Oslo, the University of Freiburg, the University of Oxford, and the Humboldt-Universität zu Berlin, from which he retired in 2001.

He was honored by the Association for Symbolic Logic as the first Gödel Lecturer in 1990. In 2015, the European Set Theory Society awarded him and John R. Steel the Hausdorff Medal for their paper K without the measurable.

Jensen died on September 16, 2025, at the age of 89.

== Results ==
Jensen's better-known results include the:

- Axiomatic set theory NFU, a variant of New Foundations (NF) where extensionality is weakened to allow several sets with no elements, and the proof of NFU's consistency relative to Peano arithmetic;
- Fine structure theory of the constructible universe L. This work led to his being awarded in 2003 the Leroy P. Steele Prize for Seminal Contribution to Research of the American Mathematical Society for his 1972 paper titled "The fine structure of the constructible hierarchy";
- Definitions and proofs of various infinitary combinatorial principles in L, including diamond $\diamondsuit$, square, and morass;
- Jensen's covering theorem for L;
- General theory of core models and the construction of the Dodd–Jensen core model;
- Consistency of the continuum hypothesis plus Suslin's hypothesis;
- Technique of coding the universe by a real.

== Selected publications ==
=== Articles ===
- Ronald Jensen, 1969, « On the Consistency of a Slight(?) Modification of Quine's NF », Synthese 19: 250–263. With discussion by Quine. doi:10.1007/BF00568059
- The fine structure of the constructible hierarchy, Annals of Mathematical Logic, vol 4, Issue 3, August 1972, pp. 229–308 doi:10.1016/0003-4843(72)90001-0
- with Anthony J. Dodd: The core model, Annals of Mathematical Logic, vol 20, 1981, pp. 43–75. doi:10.1016/0003-4843(81)90011-5
- with Anthony J. Dodd: The covering lemma for K, Annals of Mathematical Logic, vol 22, 1982, pp. 1–30. doi:10.1016/0003-4843(82)90013-4
- Inner models and large cardinals. Bulletin of Symbolic Logic vol 1, Issue 4 (1995): 393-407. doi:10.2307/421129
- with John R. Steel: K without the measurable, The Journal of Symbolic Logic, vol 78, Issue 3, 2013, pp. 708–734. doi:10.2178/jsl.7803020

=== Books ===
- Modelle der Mengenlehre. Widerspruchsfreiheit und Unabhängigkeit der Kontinuumshypothese und des Auswahlaxioms. (Lecture Notes in Mathematics; vol. 37). Springer, Berlin 1967.
- as editor with Alexander Pestel: Set theory and model theory: proceedings of an informal symposium held at Bonn, June 1–3, 1979. Berlin; New York: Springer-Verlag, 1981.
- with Aaron Beller and Philip Welch: Coding the Universe. Cambridge University Press, Cambridge 1982, ISBN 0-521-28040-0.
