= Laver table =

Mathematical concept

In mathematics, Laver tables (named after Richard Laver, who discovered them towards the end of the 1980s in connection with his works on set theory) are tables of numbers that have certain properties of algebraic and combinatorial interest. They occur in the study of racks and quandles.

== Definition ==
For any nonnegative integer n, the n-th Laver table is the 2^{n} × 2^{n} table whose entry in the cell at row p and column q (1 ≤ p,q ≤ 2^{n}) is defined as

$$L_n(p, q) := p \star_n q$$

where $\star_n$ is the unique binary operation on {1,...,2^{n}} that satisfies the following two equations for all p, q:

$p \star_n 1 = p+1 \bmod{2^n}$	1

and

$p \star_n (q \star_n r) = (p \star_n q) \star_n (p \star_n r).$	2

Note: Equation (1) uses the notation $x \bmod 2^n$ to mean the unique member of {1,...,2^{n}} congruent to x modulo 2^{n}.

Equation (2) is known as the (left) self-distributive law, and a set endowed with any binary operation satisfying this law is called a shelf. Thus, the n-th Laver table is just the multiplication table for the unique shelf ({1,...,2^{n}}, $\star_n$) that satisfies Equation (1).

Examples: Following are the first five Laver tables, i.e. the multiplication tables for the shelves ({1,...,2^{n}}, $\star_n$), n = 0, 1, 2, 3, 4:

$\star_0$	1
1	1

$\star_1$	1	2
1	2	2
2	1	2

$\star_2$	1	2	3	4
1	2	4	2	4
2	3	4	3	4
3	4	4	4	4
4	1	2	3	4

$\star_3$	1	2	3	4	5	6	7	8
1	2	4	6	8	2	4	6	8
2	3	4	7	8	3	4	7	8
3	4	8	4	8	4	8	4	8
4	5	6	7	8	5	6	7	8
5	6	8	6	8	6	8	6	8
6	7	8	7	8	7	8	7	8
7	8	8	8	8	8	8	8	8
8	1	2	3	4	5	6	7	8

$\star_4$	1	2	3	4	5	6	7	8	9	10	11	12	13	14	15	16
1	2	12	14	16	2	12	14	16	2	12	14	16	2	12	14	16
2	3	12	15	16	3	12	15	16	3	12	15	16	3	12	15	16
3	4	8	12	16	4	8	12	16	4	8	12	16	4	8	12	16
4	5	6	7	8	13	14	15	16	5	6	7	8	13	14	15	16
5	6	8	14	16	6	8	14	16	6	8	14	16	6	8	14	16
6	7	8	15	16	7	8	15	16	7	8	15	16	7	8	15	16
7	8	16	8	16	8	16	8	16	8	16	8	16	8	16	8	16
8	9	10	11	12	13	14	15	16	9	10	11	12	13	14	15	16
9	10	12	14	16	10	12	14	16	10	12	14	16	10	12	14	16
10	11	12	15	16	11	12	15	16	11	12	15	16	11	12	15	16
11	12	16	12	16	12	16	12	16	12	16	12	16	12	16	12	16
12	13	14	15	16	13	14	15	16	13	14	15	16	13	14	15	16
13	14	16	14	16	14	16	14	16	14	16	14	16	14	16	14	16
14	15	16	15	16	15	16	15	16	15	16	15	16	15	16	15	16
15	16	16	16	16	16	16	16	16	16	16	16	16	16	16	16	16
16	1	2	3	4	5	6	7	8	9	10	11	12	13	14	15	16

There is no known closed-form expression to calculate the entries of a Laver table directly, but Patrick Dehornoy provides a simple algorithm for filling out Laver tables. First, the leftmost column is filled in. Then, the rows are filled in order from bottom to top, and each row is filled from left to right. At each point, the value that should go into the current cell can be derived from already-entered values and the properties of $\star_n$.

== Properties ==
1. For all p, q in {1,...,2^{n}}: $\ \ 2^n \star_n q = q;\ \ p \star_n 2^n = 2^n;\ \ (2^n-1)\star_n q = 2^n;\ \ p\star_n 2^{n-1}=2^n\text{ if }p\ne 2^n$.
2. For all p in {1,...,2^{n}}: $\ \ (p \star_n q)_{q=1,2,3,...}$ is periodic with period π_{n}(p) equal to a power of two.
3. For all p in {1,...,2^{n}}: $\ \ (p \star_n q)_{q=1,2,3,...,\pi_n(p)}$ is strictly increasing from $p \star_n 1 = p+1\$ to $\ p \star_n \pi_n(p) = 2^n$.
4. For all p,q: $\ p \star_n q = (p+1)^{(q)}, \text{ where } x^{(1)}=x,\ x^{(k+1)}=x^{(k)} \star_n x.$

== Are the first-row periods unbounded? ==
Unsolved problem in mathematics
Is ZFC set theory able to prove that the periods of the first rows of Laver tables are unbounded?
More unsolved problems in mathematics

Looking at just the first row in the n-th Laver table, for n = 0, 1, 2, ..., the entries in each first row are seen to be periodic with a period that's always a power of two, as mentioned in Property 2 above. The first few periods are 1, 1, 2, 4, 4, 8, 8, 8, 8, 16, 16, ... (sequence A098820 in the OEIS). This sequence is nondecreasing, and in 1995 Richard Laver proved, under the assumption that there exists a rank-into-rank (a large cardinal property), that it actually increases without bound. (It is not known whether this is also provable in ZFC without the additional large-cardinal axiom.) In any case, it grows extremely slowly; Randall Dougherty showed that 32 cannot appear in this sequence (if it ever does) until n > A(9, A(8, A(8, 254))), where A denotes the Ackermann–Péter function.
