= Racks and quandles =

Sets with binary operations analogous to the Reidemeister moves used on knot diagrams

In mathematics, racks and quandles are sets with binary operations satisfying axioms analogous to the Reidemeister moves used to manipulate knot diagrams.

While mainly used to obtain invariants of knots, they can be viewed as algebraic constructions in their own right. In particular, the definition of a quandle axiomatizes the properties of conjugation in a group.

== History ==
In 1942, Mituhisa Takasaki introduced an algebraic structure which he called a kei (圭), which would later come to be known as an involutive quandle. His motivation was to find a nonassociative algebraic structure to capture the notion of a reflection in the context of finite geometry. The idea was rediscovered and generalized in an unpublished 1959 correspondence between John Conway and Gavin Wraith, who at the time were undergraduate students at the University of Cambridge. It is here that the modern definitions of quandles and of racks first appear. Wraith had become interested in these structures (which he initially dubbed sequentials) while at school. Conway renamed them wracks, partly as a pun on his colleague's name, and partly because they arise as the remnants (or 'wrack and ruin') of a group when one discards the multiplicative structure and considers only the conjugation structure. The spelling 'rack' has now become prevalent.

These constructs surfaced again in the 1980s: in a 1982 paper by David Joyce (where the term quandle, an arbitrary nonsense word, was coined), in a 1982 paper by Sergei Matveev (under the name distributive groupoids) and in a 1986 conference paper by Egbert Brieskorn (where they were called automorphic sets). A detailed overview of racks and their applications in knot theory may be found in the paper by Colin Rourke and Roger Fenn.

== Racks ==
A rack may be defined as a set $\mathrm{R}$ with a binary operation $\triangleleft$ such that for every $a, b, c \in \mathrm{R}$ the self-distributive law holds:
$$a \triangleleft(b \triangleleft c) = (a  \triangleleft b) \triangleleft(a  \triangleleft c)$$

and for every $a, b \in \mathrm{R}$, there exists a unique $c \in \mathrm{R}$ such that
$$a \triangleleft c = b.$$

This definition, while terse and commonly used, is suboptimal for certain purposes because it contains an existential quantifier which is not really necessary. To avoid this, we may write the unique $c \in \mathrm{R}$ such that $a \triangleleft c = b$ as $b \triangleright a$. We then have
$$a \triangleleft c = b \iff c = b \triangleright a,$$

and thus
$$a \triangleleft(b \triangleright a) = b,$$

and
$$(a \triangleleft b) \triangleright a = b.$$

Using this idea, a rack may be equivalently defined as a set $\mathrm{R}$ with two binary operations $\triangleleft$ and $\triangleright$ such that for all $a, b, c \in \mathrm R$:

1. $a \triangleleft(b \triangleleft c) = (a \triangleleft b) \triangleleft(a \triangleleft c)$ (left self-distributive law)
2. $(c \triangleright b) \triangleright a = (c \triangleright a) \triangleright(b \triangleright a)$ (right self-distributive law)
3. $(a \triangleleft b) \triangleright a = b$
4. $a \triangleleft(b \triangleright a) = b$

It is convenient to say that the element $a \in \mathrm{R}$ is acting from the left in the expression $a \triangleleft b$, and acting from the right in the expression $b \triangleright a$. The third and fourth rack axioms then say that these left and right actions are inverses of each other. Using this, we can eliminate either one of these actions from the definition of rack. If we eliminate the right action and keep the left one, we obtain the terse definition given initially.

Many different conventions are used in the literature on racks and quandles. For example, many authors prefer to work with just the right action. Furthermore, the use of the symbols $\triangleleft$ and $\triangleright$ is by no means universal: many authors use exponential notation
$$a \triangleleft b = {}^a b$$

and
$$b \triangleright a = b^a,$$

while many others write
$$b \triangleright a = b \star a.$$

Yet another equivalent definition of a rack is that it is a set where each element acts on the left and right as automorphisms of the rack, with the left action being the inverse of the right one. In this definition, the fact that each element acts as automorphisms encodes the left and right self-distributivity laws, and also these laws:

$$\begin{align}
a \triangleleft(b \triangleright c) &= (a \triangleleft b) \triangleright(a \triangleleft c) \\
(c \triangleleft b) \triangleright a &= (c \triangleright a) \triangleleft(b \triangleright a)
\end{align}$$

which are consequences of the definition(s) given earlier.

== Quandles ==
A quandle is defined as an idempotent rack, $\mathrm{Q}$, such that for all $a \in \mathrm{Q}$
$$a \triangleleft a = a,$$
or equivalently
$$a \triangleright a = a.$$

== Examples and applications ==
Every group gives a quandle where the operations come from conjugation:
$$\begin{align}
a \triangleleft b &= a b a^{-1} \\
b \triangleright a &= a^{-1} b a \\
&= a^{-1} \triangleleft b
\end{align}$$

In fact, every equational law satisfied by conjugation in a group follows from the quandle axioms. So, one can think of a quandle as what is left of a group when we forget multiplication, the identity, and inverses, and only remember the operation of conjugation.

Every tame knot in three-dimensional Euclidean space (or more generally, a 3-sphere) has a 'fundamental quandle' similarly to how every knot has a knot group. The knot group of a tame knot has a Wirtinger presentation where generators of the group are given as conjugates, and thus this presentation can be used to give a presentation for the fundamental quandle: the generators are the arcs of an oriented diagram of the knot, and for each crossing in that diagram, labeling the overstrand $x$ and the left and right understrands (relative to $x$'s orientation) $u,v$ respectively, the relation

$$u \triangleright x = v$$

holds. Note that this resulting quandle need not be the same as the conjugation quandle of the knot group.

The fundamental quandle is a very powerful invariant of knots. In particular, if two tame knots have isomorphic fundamental quandles then there is a homeomorphism of three-dimensional Euclidean space, which may be orientation reversing, taking one knot to the other.

Less powerful but more easily computable invariants of knots may be obtained by counting the homomorphisms from the knot quandle to a fixed quandle $\mathrm{Q}$. Since the knot quandle has a presentation with one generator per strand in a knot diagram, these invariants can be computed by counting ways of labelling each strand by an element of $\mathrm{Q}$, subject to certain constraints. More sophisticated invariants of this sort can be constructed with the help of quandle cohomology.

The Alexander quandles are also important, since they can be used to compute the Alexander polynomial of a knot. Let $\mathrm{A}$ be a module over the ring $\mathbb{Z}[t, t^{-1}]$ of Laurent polynomials in one variable (that is, $\mathrm{A}$ is an Abelian group equipped with an automorphism, which $t$ acts by). Then the Alexander quandle is $\mathrm{A}$ made into a quandle with the left action given by
$$a \triangleleft b = tb + (1 - t)a.$$

Racks are a useful generalization of quandles in topology, since while quandles can represent knots on a round linear object (such as rope or a thread), racks can represent ribbons, which may be twisted as well as knotted.

A quandle $\mathrm{Q}$ is said to be involutory if for all $a, b \in \mathrm{Q}$,
$$a \triangleleft(a \triangleleft b) = b$$

or equivalently,
$$(b \triangleright a) \triangleright a = b .$$

This may be stated more simply as
$$a \triangleleft b = b \triangleright a ,$$
which allows an equational definition with only one operation.

Any symmetric space gives an involutory quandle, where $a \triangleleft b$ is the result of 'reflecting $b$ through $a$'.

== See also ==
- Biracks and biquandles
- Laver table
