= Hausdorff Medal =

Mathematical award

The Hausdorff medal is a mathematical prize awarded every two years by the European Set Theory Society. The award recognises the work considered to have had the most impact within set theory among all articles published in the previous five years. The award is named after the German mathematician Felix Hausdorff (1868–1942).

== Winners ==
- 2013: Hugh Woodin for his articles "Suitable extender models I" and "Suitable extender models II: beyond ω-huge".
- 2015: Ronald Jensen and John Steel for their article "K without the measurable".
- 2017: Maryanthe Malliaris and Saharon Shelah for their article "General topology meets model theory, on 𝔭 and 𝔱".
- 2019: Itay Neeman for his work on "the new method of iterating forcing using side conditions and the tree property".
- 2022: David Asperó and Ralf Schindler for their positive solution to the long standing conjecture that MM++, a strong form of Martin’s Maximum, implies Woodin’s Axiom (*).
- 2024: Gabriel Goldberg for his work on the Ultrapower Axiom, isolating abstract properties of inner models with supercompact cardinals.

== See also ==
- List of mathematics awards
