= Better-quasi-ordering =

In order theory a better-quasi-ordering or bqo is a quasi-ordering that does not admit a certain type of bad array. Every better-quasi-ordering is a well-quasi-ordering.

== Motivation ==
Though well-quasi-ordering is an appealing notion, many important infinitary operations do not preserve well-quasi-orderedness. An example due to Richard Rado illustrates this. In a 1965 paper Crispin Nash-Williams formulated the stronger notion of better-quasi-ordering in order to prove that the class of trees of height ω is well-quasi-ordered under the topological minor relation. Since then, many quasi-orderings have been proven to be well-quasi-orderings by proving them to be better-quasi-orderings. For instance, Richard Laver established Laver's theorem (previously a conjecture of Roland Fraïssé) by proving that the class of scattered linear order types is better-quasi-ordered. More recently, Carlos Martinez-Ranero has proven that, under the proper forcing axiom, the class of Aronszajn lines is better-quasi-ordered under the embeddability relation.

== Definition ==
It is common in better-quasi-ordering theory to write ${_*}x$ for the sequence $x$ with the first term omitted. Write $[\omega]^{<\omega}$ for the set of finite, strictly increasing sequences with terms in $\omega$, and define a relation $\triangleleft$ on $[\omega]^{<\omega}$ as follows: $s\triangleleft t$ if there is $u \in [\omega]^{<\omega}$ such that $s$ is a strict initial segment of $u$ and $t={}_*u$. The relation $\triangleleft$ is not transitive.

A block $B$ is an infinite subset of $[\omega]^{<\omega}$ that contains an initial segment of every infinite subset of $\bigcup B$. For a quasi-order $Q$, a $Q$-pattern is a function from some block $B$ into $Q$. A $Q$-pattern $f\colon B\to Q$ is said to be bad if $f(s)\not \le_Q f(t)$ for every pair $s,t\in B$ such that $s\triangleleft t$; otherwise $f$ is good. A quasi-ordering $Q$ is called a better-quasi-ordering if there is no bad $Q$-pattern.

In order to make this definition easier to work with, Nash-Williams defines a barrier to be a block whose elements are pairwise incomparable under the inclusion relation $\subset$. A $Q$-array is a $Q$-pattern whose domain is a barrier. By observing that every block contains a barrier, one sees that $Q$ is a better-quasi-ordering if and only if there is no bad $Q$-array.

== Simpson's alternative definition ==
Simpson introduced an alternative definition of better-quasi-ordering in terms of Borel functions $[\omega]^{\omega}\to Q$, where $[\omega]^{\omega}$, the set of infinite subsets of $\omega$, is given the usual product topology.

Let $Q$ be a quasi-ordering and endow $Q$ with the discrete topology. A $Q$-array is a Borel function $[A]^{\omega}\to Q$ for some infinite subset $A$ of $\omega$. A $Q$-array $f$ is bad if $f(X)\not\le_Q f({_*}X)$ for every $X\in[A]^{\omega}$; $f$ is good otherwise. The quasi-ordering $Q$ is a better-quasi-ordering if there is no bad $Q$-array in this sense.

== Major theorems ==
Many major results in better-quasi-ordering theory are consequences of the Minimal Bad Array Lemma, which appears in Simpson's paper as follows. See also Laver's paper, where the Minimal Bad Array Lemma was first stated as a result. The technique was present in Nash-Williams' original 1965 paper.

Suppose $(Q,\le_Q)$ is a quasi-order. A partial ranking $\le'$ of $Q$ is a well-founded partial ordering of $Q$ such that $q\le'r \to q \le_Q r$. For bad $Q$-arrays (in the sense of Simpson) $f\colon [A]^{\omega}\to Q$ and $g\colon [B]^{\omega}\to Q$, define:

$$g\le^* f \text{ if } B\subseteq A \text{ and } g(X)\le' f(X) \text{ for every } X\in[B]^{\omega}$$
$$g <^* f \text{ if } B\subseteq A \text{ and } g(X) <' f(X) \text{ for every } X\in[B]^{\omega}$$

We say a bad $Q$-array $g$ is minimal bad (with respect to the partial ranking $\le'$) if there is no bad $Q$-array $f$ such that $f <^* g$. The definitions of $\le^*$ and $<'$ depend on a partial ranking $\le'$ of $Q$. The relation $<^*$ is not the strict part of the relation $\le^*$.

Theorem (Minimal Bad Array Lemma). Let $Q$ be a quasi-order equipped with a partial ranking and suppose $f$ is a bad $Q$-array. Then there is a minimal bad $Q$-array $g$ such that $g \le^* f$.

== See also ==
- Well-quasi-ordering
- Well-order
