= Laver function =

Mathematical function in set theory

In set theory, a Laver function (or Laver diamond, named after its inventor, Richard Laver) is a function connected with supercompact cardinals.

== Definition ==
If κ is a supercompact cardinal, a Laver function is a function ƒ:κ → V_{κ} such that for every set x and every cardinal λ ≥ |TC(x)| + κ there is a supercompact measure U on [λ]^{<κ} such that if j_{U} is the associated elementary embedding then j_{U}(ƒ)(κ) = x. (Here V_{κ} denotes the κ-th level of the cumulative hierarchy, TC(x) is the transitive closure of x)

== Applications ==
The original application of Laver functions was the following theorem of Laver. If κ is supercompact, there is a κ-c.c. forcing notion (P, ≤) such after forcing with (P, ≤) the following holds: κ is supercompact and remains supercompact after forcing with any κ-directed closed forcing.

There are many other applications, for example the proof of the consistency of the proper forcing axiom.
