= Biracks and biquandles =

Special ordered sets

In mathematics, biquandles and biracks are sets with binary operations that generalize quandles and racks. In the theory of virtual knots, biquandles are analogous to quandles in the theory of classical knots. Biracks and racks have the same relation, while a biquandle is a birack which satisfies some additional conditions.

== Definitions ==
A birack is a set $X$, two right-invertible operations $\underline{\triangleright}$$, \overline{\triangleright}$ and a bijection $\pi \colon X \to X$ such that for all $a,b,c \in X$,

1. $\pi(a \overline{\triangleright} a) = a \underline{\triangleright} a$ and $\pi(a) \overline{\triangleright} a = a \underline{\triangleright} \pi(a)$.

2. The map $H \colon X \times X \to X \times X$ defined by $H(a,b) = (b \overline{\triangleright} a, a \underline{\triangleright} b)$ is invertible.

3. The exchange laws

- $(a \underline{\triangleright} b) \underline{\triangleright} (c \underline{\triangleright} b ) = (a \underline{\triangleright} c) \underline{\triangleright} (b \overline{\triangleright} c )$
- $(a \underline{\triangleright} b) \overline{\triangleright} (c \underline{\triangleright} b ) = (a \overline{\triangleright} c) \underline{\triangleright} (b \overline{\triangleright} c )$
- $(a \overline{\triangleright} b) \overline{\triangleright} (c \overline{\triangleright} b ) = (a \overline{\triangleright} c) \overline{\triangleright} (b \underline{\triangleright} c )$.

If $\pi = id$ is the identity map, $X$ is called a biquandle.

Biracks and biquandles were first introduced by Roger Fenn, Mercedes Jordan-Santana and Louis Kauffman in 2004.

Note that the three conditions above correspond directly to the three Reidemeister moves in knot therory, showing the close connections between knots and biracks.

== Examples ==
Let $X$ be a set with two bijection $\sigma, \tau \colon X \to X$ that commute. Then the constant action birack is defined by $a \underline{\triangleright} b = \sigma (a)$ and $a \overline{\triangleright} b = \tau ( x )$ and $\pi ( a) = \tau^{-1}(\sigma(a))$.

Any rack $(X, \triangleright)$ is a birack with $a \underline{\triangleright} b = a \triangleright b$ and $a \overline{\triangleright} b = a$ for all $a, b \in X$. Note that if we insert these operations into the conditions in the definition above, we regain the exact definition of a rack.

Let $R$ be a commutative ring with identity and $X$ an $R[s^{\plusmn1}, t^{\plusmn1}]$-module. Then the Alexander biquandle is defined as $a \underline{\triangleright} b = ta + (s-t)b$ and $a \overline{\triangleright} b = sa$. For $s = 1$ this is a quandle.
