= Itay Neeman =

Israeli mathematician

Itay Neeman (Hebrew: איתי נאמן; born 1972) is an Israeli set theorist working as a professor of mathematics at the University of California, Los Angeles. He has made major contributions to the theory of inner models, determinacy and forcing.

== Early life and education ==
Neeman was born in 1972 in Safed, Israel. After studying mathematics at King's College London and the University of Oxford, he earned his Ph.D. at the University of California, Berkeley, in 1996, under the supervision of John R. Steel.

== Recognition ==
Neeman won a CAREER Award in 2001. He was an invited speaker at the International Congress of Mathematicians in 2006. In 2012, the Simons Foundation named Neeman as one of their Simons Fellows, in the inaugural year of the Simons Fellows program.

In 2019 he was awarded the Hausdorff Medal, by the European Set Theory Society. The award cited three of his papers for their work on "iterating forcing using side conditions and the tree property" as having been the most significant contribution to set theory in the previous five years.

== Selected publications ==
- Neeman, Itay (2004), The determinacy of long games, De Gruyter Series in Logic and its Applications, vol. 7, Berlin: Walter de Gruyter, doi:10.1515/9783110200065, ISBN 3-11-018341-2.
- Neeman, Itay (2014), "Forcing with sequences of models of two types", Notre Dame Journal of Formal Logic, 55 (2): 265–298, doi:10.1215/00294527-2420666, MR 3201836. One of the papers cited for Neeman's Hausdorff Medal.
- Neeman, Itay (2014), "The tree property up to $\aleph_{\omega+1}$", The Journal of Symbolic Logic, 79 (2): 429–459, doi:10.1017/jsl.2013.25, MR 3224975, S2CID 5950605. One of the papers cited for Neeman's Hausdorff Medal.
- Neeman, Itay (2017), "Two applications of finite side conditions at $\omega_2$", Archive for Mathematical Logic, 56 (7–8): 983–1036, doi:10.1007/s00153-017-0550-y, MR 3696074, S2CID 11990342. One of the papers cited for Neeman's Hausdorff Medal.
