= Maryanthe Malliaris =

American mathematician

Maryanthe Elizabeth Malliaris is a professor of mathematics at the University of Chicago, a specialist in model theory.

== Early life and education ==
Malliaris is the daughter of Anastasios G. (Tassos) Malliaris, an economist at Loyola University Chicago, and Mary E. Malliaris, Professor of Information Systems at Loyola.

As an undergraduate at Harvard College, Malliaris wrote for the Harvard Crimson, contributed a biography of Polish sociologist Zygmunt Bauman to the Encyclopedia of Postmodernism,^{[ZB]} and worked for a startup called Zaps.

She graduated from Harvard in 2001 with a concentration in mathematics, and earned her PhD in 2009 from the University of California, Berkeley under the supervision of Thomas Scanlon. Her dissertation was Persistence and Regularity in Unstable Model Theory.

== Research ==
In her dissertation and postdoctoral research, Malliaris studied unstable model theory and its connection, via characteristic sequences, to graph theoretic concepts such as the Szemerédi regularity lemma. This work culminated in a proof with Saharon Shelah of the stable regularity lemma, a strengthening of the Szemerédi regularity lemma in the case of stable graphs.

She is also known for two joint papers with Shelah connecting topology, set theory, and model theory.^{[MS13]}^{[MS16]} In this work, Malliaris and Shelah used Keisler's order, a construction from model theory, to prove the equality between two cardinal characteristics of the continuum, 𝖕 and 𝖙, which are greater than the smallest infinite cardinal and less than or equal to the cardinality of the continuum. This resolved a problem in set theory that had been open for fifty years. Their work also solved another problem, by showing that SOP2 theories are maximal in Keisler's order.

== Awards and honors ==
Malliaris won a Kurt Gödel Research Prize in 2010 for her work in unstable model theory.

In 2017, she and Saharon Shelah shared the Hausdorff Medal of the European Set Theory Society for their joint papers.

She was an invited speaker at the 2018 International Congress of Mathematicians. She received the Quantrell Award.

== Selected publications ==
ZB.	Malliaris, Maryanthe (2003), "Zygmunt Bauman", in Taylor, Victor E.; Winquist, Charles E. (eds.), Encyclopedia of Postmodernism, Psychology Press, pp. 30–31, ISBN 9780415308861

MS13.	Malliaris, Maryanthe; Shelah, Saharon (2013), "General topology meets model theory, on 𝔭 and 𝔱", Proceedings of the National Academy of Sciences of the United States of America, 110 (33): 13300–13305, Bibcode:2013PNAS..11013300M, doi:10.1073/pnas.1306114110, MR 3105597, PMC 3746882, PMID 23836659

MS16.	Malliaris, M.; Shelah, S. (2016), "Cofinality spectrum theorems in model theory, set theory, and general topology", Journal of the American Mathematical Society, 29 (1): 237–297, arXiv:1208.5424, doi:10.1090/jams830, MR 3402699, S2CID 13182394
