= Adrian Mathias =

British mathematician

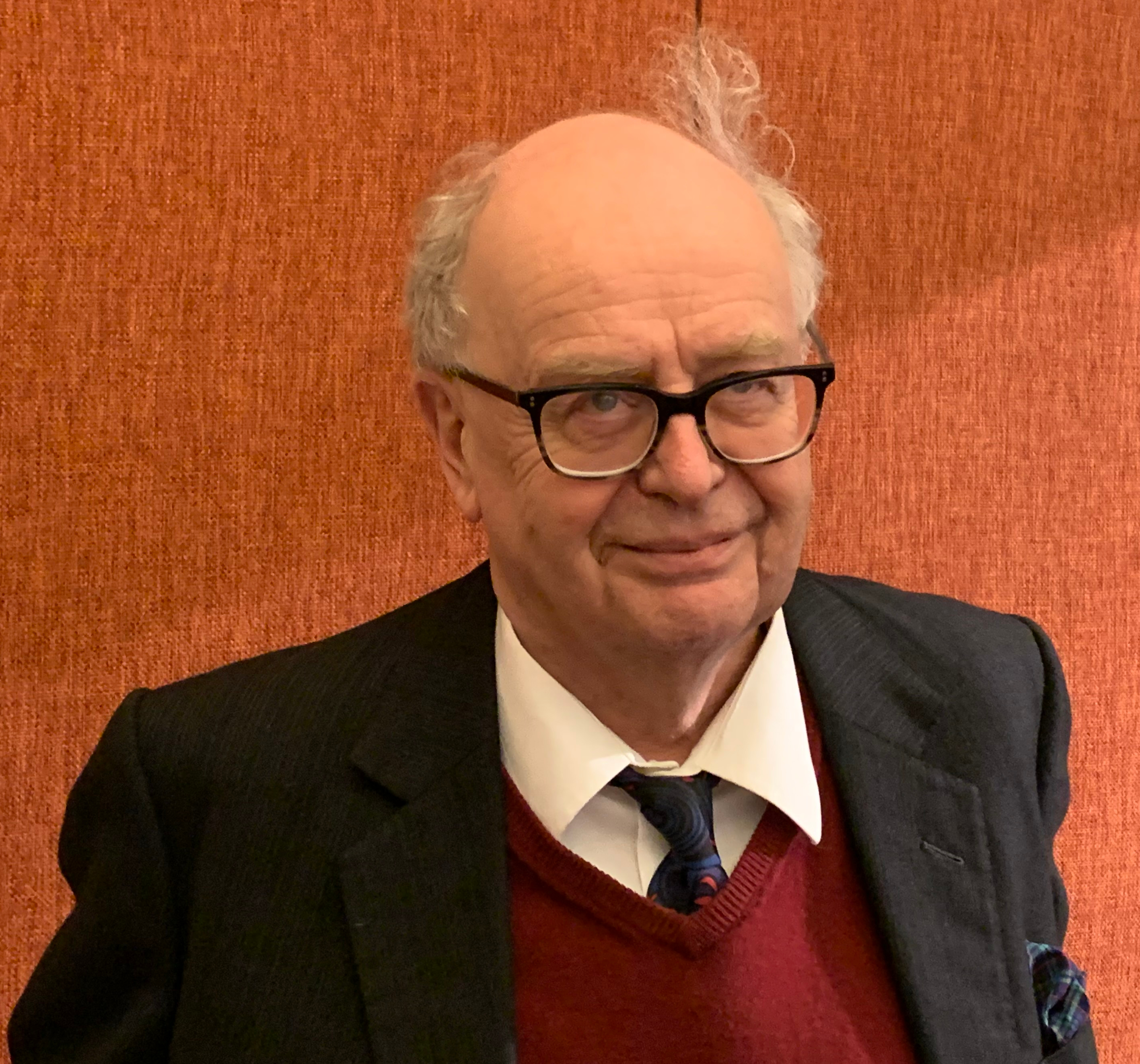
- Mathias in London, February 2020
- Born: 12 February 1944 (age 82)
- Education: Trinity College, Cambridge
- Scientific career
- Fields: Mathematics
- Workplaces: University of Cambridge; Université de la Réunion
- Doctoral advisor: Ronald Jensen; John Horton Conway
- Doctoral students: Akihiro Kanamori; Thomas Forster

Adrian Richard David Mathias (born 12 February 1944) is a British mathematician working in set theory. The forcing notion Mathias forcing is named for him.

== Career ==
Mathias was educated at Shrewsbury and Trinity College, Cambridge, where he read mathematics and graduated in 1965. After graduation, he moved to Bonn in Germany where he studied with Ronald Jensen, visiting UCLA, Stanford, the University of Wisconsin, and Monash University during that period.

In 1969, he returned to Cambridge as a research fellow at Peterhouse and was admitted to the Ph.D. at Cambridge University in 1970. From 1969 to 1990, Mathias was a fellow of Peterhouse; during this period, he was the editor of the Mathematical Proceedings of the Cambridge Philosophical Society from 1972 to 1974, spent one academic year (1978/79) as Hochschulassistent to Jensen in Freiburg and another year (1989/90) at the MSRI in Berkeley. After leaving Peterhouse in 1990, Mathias had visiting positions in Warsaw, at the Mathematisches Forschungsinstitut Oberwolfach, at the CRM in Barcelona, and in Bogotá, before becoming Professor at the Université de la Réunion. He retired from his professorship in 2012 and was admitted to the higher degree of Doctor of Science at the University of Cambridge in 2015.

== Work ==
Mathias became mathematically active soon after the introduction of forcing by Paul Cohen, and Kanamori credits his survey of forcing that was eventually published as Surrealist landscape with figures as being a "vital source" on forcing in its early days.

His paper Happy families, extending his 1968 Cambridge thesis, proves important properties of the forcing now known as Mathias forcing. In the same paper he shows that no (infinite) maximal almost disjoint family can be analytic.

Mathias also used forcing to separate two weak forms of the Axiom of choice, showing that the ordering principle, which states that any set can be linearly ordered, does not imply the Boolean Prime Ideal Theorem.

His more recent work on forcing includes the study of the theory PROVI of provident sets, a minimalist axiom system that still allows the forcing construction to proceed.

Mathias is also known for his writings around sociological aspects of logic. These include The ignorance of Bourbaki and Hilbert, Bourbaki and the scorning of logic, in which Mathias criticises Bourbaki's approach to logic; in A Term of Length 4,523,659,424,929 he shows that the number in the title is the number of symbols required for Bourbaki's definition of the number 1. Mathias has also considered claims that standard ZFC is stronger than necessary for "mainstream" mathematics; his paper What is Mac Lane missing? on this topic appeared alongside Saunders Mac Lane's response Is Mathias an ontologist?. Mathias also conducted a detailed study of the strength of a weakened system suggested by Mac Lane.
