= Scattered order =

In mathematical order theory, a scattered order is a linear order that contains no densely ordered subset with more than one element.

A characterization due to Hausdorff states that the class of all scattered orders is the smallest class of linear orders that contains the singleton orders and is closed under well-ordered and reverse well-ordered sums.

Laver's theorem (generalizing a conjecture of Roland Fraïssé on countable orders) states that the embedding relation on the class of countable unions of scattered orders is a well-quasi-order.

The order topology of a scattered order is scattered. The converse implication does not hold, as witnessed by the lexicographic order on $\mathbb Q\times\mathbb Z$.
