= John Stillwell =

Australian mathematician

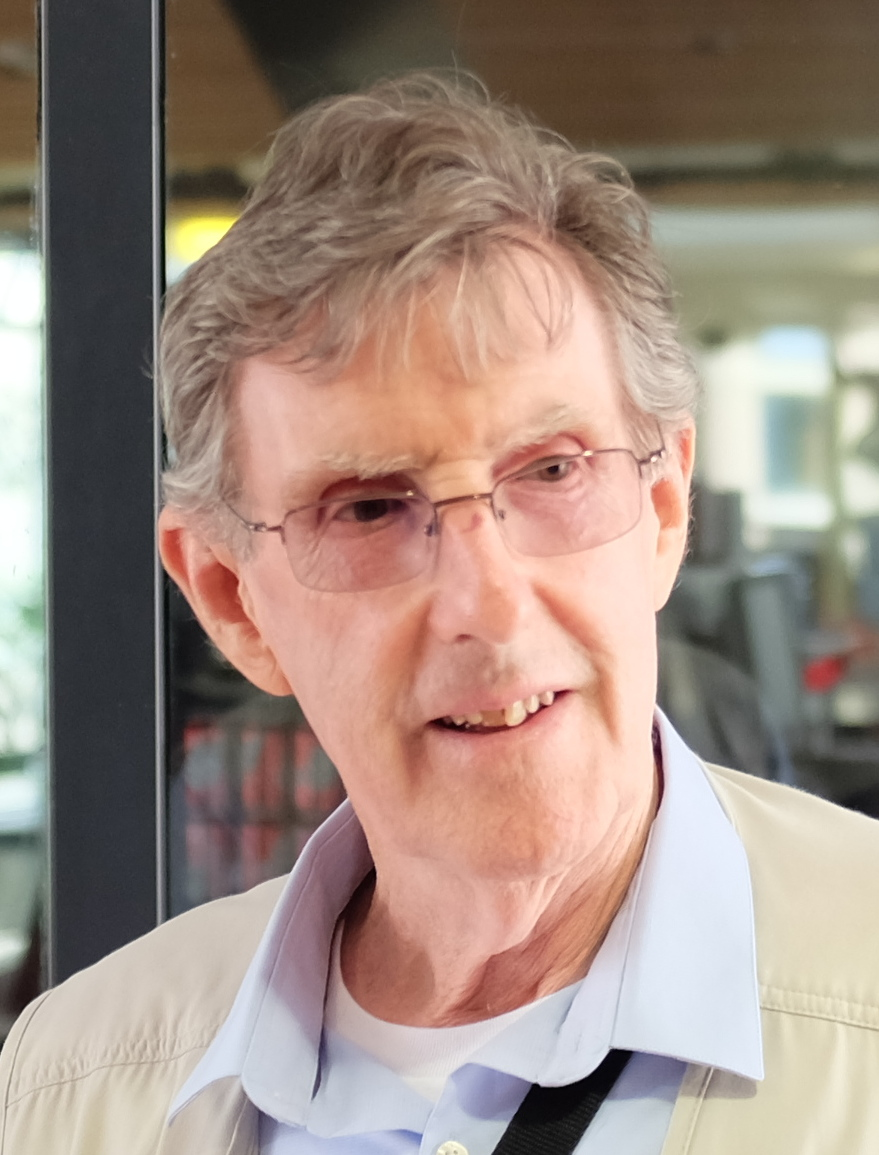
- Born: 12 August 1942 (age 84); Melbourne, Australia
- Education: University of Melbourne; Massachusetts Institute of Technology (Ph.D., 1970)
- Awards: Chauvenet Prize (2005)
- Scientific career
- Fields: Mathematics
- Workplaces: 1970 until 2001: Monash University; 2002 to date: University of San Francisco
- Doctoral advisor: Hartley Rogers, Jr

John Colin Stillwell (born 1942) is an Australian mathematician on the faculties of the University of San Francisco and Monash University.

== Biography ==
He was born in Melbourne, Australia and lived there until he went to the Massachusetts Institute of Technology for his doctorate. He received his PhD from MIT in 1970, working under Hartley Rogers, Jr, who had himself worked under Alonzo Church. From 1970 until 2001, he taught at Monash University back in Australia and in 2002 began teaching in San Francisco.

== Honors ==
In 2005, Stillwell was the recipient of the Mathematical Association of America's prestigious Chauvenet Prize for his article "The Story of the 120-Cell," Notices of the AMS, January 2001, pp. 17–24. In 2012, he became a fellow of the American Mathematical Society.

== Works ==
=== Books ===
Stillwell is the author of many textbooks and other books on mathematics including:

- Classical Topology and Combinatorial Group Theory, 1980, ISBN 0-387-97970-0
  - 2012 pbk reprint of 1993 2nd edition ISBN 978-0-387-97970-0
- Mathematics and Its History, 1989, pbk reprint of 2nd edition 2002; 3rd edition 2010, ISBN 0-387-95336-1
- Geometry of Surfaces, 1992, ISBN 0-387-97743-0; 2012 pbk reprint of 1st edition
- Elements of Algebra: Geometry, Numbers, Equations, 1994, ISBN 0-387-94290-4
- Numbers and Geometry, 1998, ISBN 0-387-98289-2
- Elements of Number Theory, 2003, ISBN 0-387-95587-9
- The Four Pillars of Geometry, 2005, ISBN 0-387-25530-3
- Yearning for the Impossible: The Surprising Truths of Mathematics, 2006, ISBN 1-56881-254-X
- Naive Lie Theory, 2008, ISBN 0-387-98289-2
- Roads to Infinity, 2010, ISBN 978-1-56881-466-7
- The Real Numbers: An Introduction to Set Theory and Analysis, 2013, ISBN 978-3319015767
- Elements of Mathematics: From Euclid to Gödel, 2016, ISBN 978-0691171685
- Reverse Mathematics: Proofs from the Inside Out, 2018, ISBN 978-0691177175
- A Concise History of Mathematics for Philosophers, 2019, ISBN 978-1108610124
- The Story of Proof: Logic and the History of Mathematics, 2022, ISBN 978-0691234366

=== Selected articles ===
- Stillwell, John (1982). "The word problem and the isomorphism problem for groups". Bulletin of the American Mathematical Society. (N.S.). 6 (1): 33–56. doi:10.1090/s0273-0979-1982-14963-1. MR 0634433.
- Stillwell, John (1983). "Efficient computations in groups and simplicial complexes". Transactions of the American Mathematical Society. 276 (2): 715–727. doi:10.1090/s0002-9947-1983-0688973-8. MR 0688973.
- Lenard, Andrew; Stillwell, John (1983). "An algorithmically unsolvable problem in analysis". Proceedings of the American Mathematical Society. 88 (1): 129–130. doi:10.1090/s0002-9939-1983-0691292-2. MR 0691292.
- Stillwell, John (1987). "The occurrence problem for mapping class groups". Proceedings of the American Mathematical Society. 101 (3): 411–416. doi:10.1090/s0002-9939-1987-0908639-5. MR 0908639.
- Stillwell, John (January 2001). "The Story of the 120-Cell" (PDF). Notices of the AMS. 48 (1): 17–25.
- Stillwell, John (2012). "Poincaré and the early history of 3-manifolds" (PDF). Bulletin of the American Mathematical Society. (N.S.). 49 (4): 555–576. doi:10.1090/s0273-0979-2012-01385-x.
