= Ralph McKenzie =

American mathematician

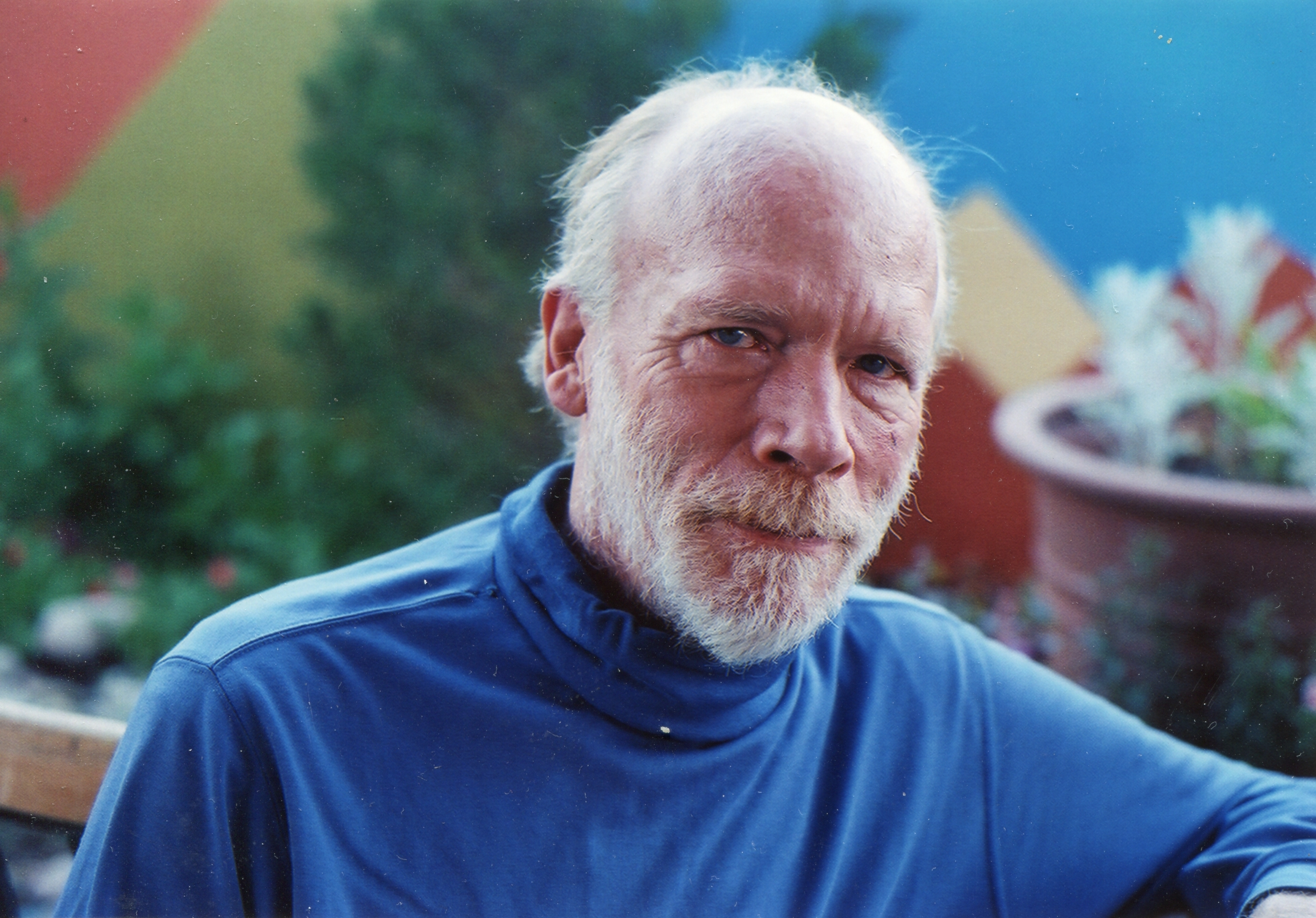
- Born: October 20, 1941; Cisco, Texas
- Education: University of Colorado Boulder
- Scientific career
- Fields: Mathematics, logic, Algebra
- Workplaces: Vanderbilt University, University of California, Berkeley
- Doctoral advisor: James Donald Monk
- Doctoral students: Richard Laver; Richard J. Thompson

Ralph Nelson Whitfield McKenzie (born October 20, 1941) is an American mathematician, logician, and universal algebraist. He received his doctorate from the University of Colorado Boulder in 1967.

He is a fellow of the American Mathematical Society.

== Selected works ==
- McKenzie with David Hobby: The structure of finite algebras, AMS 1988
- McKenzie with Ralph Freese: Commutator Theory for Congruence Modular Varieties, London Math. Society Lecture Notes, Cambridge University Press 1987
