= Shai Ben-David =

Israeli-Canadian computer scientist and professor

- שי בן-דוד
- Born: Jerusalem, Israel
- Education: Hebrew University of Jerusalem (PhD)
- Known for: Research in theoretical machine learning, learning theory, online algorithms
- Awards: ACM Fellow, NeurIPS Best Paper Award
- Scientific career
- Fields: Theoretical machine learning
- Workplaces: University of Waterloo
- Doctoral advisor: Saharon Shelah

Shai Ben-David (Hebrew: שי בן-דוד) is an Israeli-Canadian computer scientist and professor at the University of Waterloo. He is known for his research in theoretical machine learning.

== Biography ==
Shai Ben-David grew up in Jerusalem, Israel and received a Ph.D. in mathematics from the Hebrew University of Jerusalem, where he was advised by Saharon Shelah. He held postdoctoral positions in mathematics and computer science at the University of Toronto. He was a professor of computer science at the Technion and also held visiting positions at the Australian National University and Cornell University.

He has been a professor of computer science at the University of Waterloo since 2004.

== Selected publications and awards ==
Ben-David has written highly cited papers on learning theory and online algorithms. He is a co-author, with Shai Shalev-Shwartz, of the book "Understanding Machine Learning: From Theory to Algorithms"(Cambridge University Press, 2014).

He received the best paper award at NeurIPS 2018. for work on sample complexity of distribution learning problems. He was the President of the Association for Computational Learning from 2009 to 2011.

== Awards ==
- ACM Fellow (2023)

== Publications ==
- Shalev-Shwartz, Shai; Ben-David, Shai (2014). Understanding machine learning: From theory to algorithms. Cambridge University Press.
- Ben-David, Shai; Blitzer, John; Crammer, Koby; Kulesza, Alex; Pereira, Fernando; Wortman Vaughan, Jennifer (2010). "A theory of learning from different domains". Machine Learning. 79. Springer US: 151–175.
- Ben-David, Shai; Blitzer, John; Crammer, Koby; Pereira, Fernando (2006). "Analysis of representations for domain adaptation". Advances in Neural Information Processing Systems. 19.
- Kifer, Daniel; Ben-David, Shai; Gehrke, Johannes (2004). "Detecting change in data streams". VLDB. 4.
