= Tehini Airport =

Airport in Ivory Coast

Bouna Tehini Airport
- IATA: BQO; ICAO: DIBN

Summary
- Airport type: Public
- Serves: Bouna
- Elevation AMSL: 1,247 ft (380 m)
- Coordinates: 9°15′20″N 3°2′0″W

Map
- Location within Ivory Coast

Runways
Direction	Length		Surface
Direction	ft	m	Surface
02/20	4,593	1,400	Unpaved
- Source: Google Maps

Bouna Tehini Airport (IATA: BQO, ICAO: DIBN) is an airport serving Bouna, Côte d'Ivoire.

== See also ==
- Transport in Côte d'Ivoire
