= Well-quasi-ordering =

Mathematical concept for comparing objects

Transitive binary relations

	Symmetric	Antisymmetric	Connected	Well-founded	Has joins	Has meets	Reflexive	Irreflexive	Asymmetric
			Total, Semiconnex					Anti- reflexive
Equivalence relation	✓	✗	✗	✗	✗	✗	✓	✗	✗
Preorder (Quasiorder)	✗	✗	✗	✗	✗	✗	✓	✗	✗
Partial order	✗	✓	✗	✗	✗	✗	✓	✗	✗
Total preorder	✗	✗	✓	✗	✗	✗	✓	✗	✗
Total order	✗	✓	✓	✗	✗	✗	✓	✗	✗
Prewellordering	✗	✗	✓	✓	✗	✗	✓	✗	✗
Well-quasi-ordering	✗	✗	✗	✓	✗	✗	✓	✗	✗
Well-ordering	✗	✓	✓	✓	✗	✗	✓	✗	✗
Lattice	✗	✓	✗	✗	✓	✓	✓	✗	✗
Join-semilattice	✗	✓	✗	✗	✓	✗	✓	✗	✗
Meet-semilattice	✗	✓	✗	✗	✗	✓	✓	✗	✗
Strict partial order	✗	✓	✗	✗	✗	✗	✗	✓	✓
Strict weak order	✗	✓	✗	✗	✗	✗	✗	✓	✓
Strict total order	✗	✓	✓	✗	✗	✗	✗	✓	✓
	Symmetric	Antisymmetric	Connected	Well-founded	Has joins	Has meets	Reflexive	Irreflexive	Asymmetric
Definitions, for all $a, b$ and $S\neq\varnothing :$	$$\begin{align}&aRb \\ \Rightarrow{} &bRa\end{align}$$	$$\begin{align}aRb\text{ and }&bRa \\ \Rightarrow a ={} &b\end{align}$$	$$\begin{align}a \neq{} &b \Rightarrow \\ aRb\text{ or }&bRa\end{align}$$	$$\begin{align}\min S \\ \text{exists}\end{align}$$	$$\begin{align}a \vee b \\ \text{exists}\end{align}$$	$$\begin{align}a \wedge b \\ \text{exists}\end{align}$$	$aRa$	$\text{not }aRa$	$$\begin{align}aRb \Rightarrow \\ \text{not }bRa\end{align}$$

✓ indicates that the column's property is always true for the row's term (at the very left), while ✗ indicates that the property is not guaranteed
in general (it might, or might not, hold). For example, that every equivalence relation is symmetric, but not necessarily antisymmetric,
is indicated by ✓ in the "Symmetric" column and ✗ in the "Antisymmetric" column, respectively.

All definitions tacitly require the homogeneous relation $R$ be transitive: for all $a, b, c,$ if $aRb$ and $bRc$ then $aRc.$
A term's definition may require additional properties that are not listed in this table.

In mathematics, specifically order theory, a well-quasi-ordering or wqo on a set $X$ is a quasi-ordering of $X$ for which every infinite sequence of elements $x_0, x_1, x_2, \ldots$ from $X$ contains a non-decreasing pair $x_i \leq x_j$ with $i < j.$

== Motivation ==
Well-founded induction can be used on any set with a well-founded relation, thus one is interested in when a quasi-order is well-founded. (Here, by abuse of terminology, a quasiorder $\le$ is said to be well-founded if the corresponding strict order $x\le y\land y\nleq x$ is a well-founded relation.) However the class of well-founded quasiorders is not closed under certain operations—that is, when a quasi-order is used to obtain a new quasi-order on a set of structures derived from our original set, this quasiorder is found to be not well-founded. By placing stronger restrictions on the original well-founded quasiordering one can hope to ensure that our derived quasiorderings are still well-founded.

An example of this is the power set operation. Given a quasiordering $\le$ for a set $X$ one can define a quasiorder $\le^{+}$ on $X$'s power set $P(X)$ by setting $A \le^{+} B$ if and only if for each element of $A$ one can find some element of $B$ that is larger than it with respect to $\le$. One can show that this quasiordering on $P(X)$ need not be well-founded, but if one takes the original quasi-ordering to be a well-quasi-ordering, then it is.

== Formal definition ==
A well-quasi-ordering on a set $X$ is a quasi-ordering (i.e., a reflexive, transitive binary relation) such that any infinite sequence of elements $x_0, x_1, x_2, \ldots$ from $X$ contains an increasing pair $x_i \le x_j$ with $i< j$. The set $X$ is said to be well-quasi-ordered, or shortly wqo.

A well partial order, or a wpo, is a wqo that is a proper ordering relation, i.e., it is antisymmetric.

Among other ways of defining wqo's, one is to say that they are quasi-orderings which do not contain infinite strictly decreasing sequences (of the form $x_0> x_1> x_2> \cdots$) (Note: Here $x<y$ means: $x\le y$ and not $y \leq x.$) nor infinite sequences of pairwise incomparable elements. Hence a quasi-order (X, ≤) is wqo if and only if (X, <) is well-founded and has no infinite antichains.

== Ordinal type ==
Let $X$ be well partially ordered. A (necessarily finite) sequence $(x_1, x_2, \ldots, x_n)$ of elements of $X$ that contains no pair $x_i \le x_j$ with $i< j$ is usually called a bad sequence. The tree of bad sequences $T_X$ is the tree that contains a vertex for each bad sequence, and an edge joining each nonempty bad sequence $(x_1, \ldots, x_{n-1}, x_n)$ to its parent $(x_1, \ldots, x_{n-1})$. The root of $T_X$ corresponds to the empty sequence. Since $X$ contains no infinite bad sequence, the tree $T_X$ contains no infinite path starting at the root. Therefore, each vertex $v$ of $T_X$ has an ordinal height $o(v)$, which is defined by transfinite induction as $o(v) = \lim_{w \mathrm{\ child\ of\ } v} (o(w)+1)$. The ordinal type of $X$, denoted $o(X)$, is the ordinal height of the root of $T_X$.

A linearization of $X$ is an extension of the partial order into a total order. It is easy to verify that $o(X)$ is an upper bound on the ordinal type of every linearization of $X$. De Jongh and Parikh proved that in fact there always exists a linearization of $X$ that achieves the maximal ordinal type $o(X)$.

== Examples ==
Pic.1: A non-example: integers with the usual order

Pic.2: Another non-example: Hasse diagram of the natural numbers ordered by divisibility

Pic.3: Hasse diagram of $\N^2$ with componentwise order

- $(\N, \le)$, the set of natural numbers with standard ordering, is a well partial order (in fact, a well-order). However, $(\Z, \le)$, the set of positive and negative integers (see Pic.1), is not a well-quasi-order, because it is not well-founded. The infinite sequence -1, -2,... contains no increasing pair.
- $(\N, |)$, the set of natural numbers ordered by divisibility, is not a well-quasi-order: the prime numbers are an infinite antichain (see Pic.2).
- $(\N^k, \le)$, the set of vectors of $k$ natural numbers (where $k$ is finite) with component-wise ordering, is a well partial order (Dickson's lemma; see Pic.3). More generally, if $(X, \le)$ is well-quasi-order, then $(X^k,\le^k)$ is also a well-quasi-order for all $k$.
- Let $X$ be an arbitrary finite set with at least two elements. The set $X^*$ of words over $X$ ordered lexicographically (as in a dictionary) is not a well-quasi-order because it contains the infinite decreasing sequence $b, ab, aab, aaab, \ldots$. Similarly, $X^*$ ordered by the prefix relation is not a well-quasi-order, because the previous sequence is an infinite antichain of this partial order. However, $X^*$ ordered by the subsequence relation is a well partial order. (If $X$ has only one element, these three partial orders are identical.)
- More generally, $(X^*,\le)$, the set of finite $X$-sequences ordered by embedding is a well-quasi-order if and only if $(X, \le)$ is a well-quasi-order (Higman's lemma). Recall that one embeds a sequence $u$ into a sequence $v$ by finding a subsequence of $v$ that has the same length as $u$ and that dominates it term by term. When $(X,=)$ is an unordered set, $u\le v$ if and only if $u$ is a subsequence of $v$.
- $(X^\omega,\le)$, the set of infinite sequences over a well-quasi-order $(X, \le)$, ordered by embedding, is not a well-quasi-order in general. That is, Higman's lemma does not carry over to infinite sequences. Better-quasi-orderings have been introduced to generalize Higman's lemma to sequences of arbitrary lengths.
- Embedding between finite trees with nodes labeled by elements of a wqo $(X, \le)$ is a wqo (Kruskal's tree theorem).
- Embedding between infinite trees with nodes labeled by elements of a wqo $(X, \le)$ is a wqo (Nash-Williams' theorem).
- Embedding between countable scattered linear order types is a well-quasi-order (Laver's theorem).
- Embedding between countable boolean algebras is a well-quasi-order. This follows from Laver's theorem and a theorem of Ketonen.
- Finite graphs ordered by a notion of embedding called "graph minor" is a well-quasi-order (Robertson–Seymour theorem).
- Graphs of finite tree-depth ordered by the induced subgraph relation form a well-quasi-order, as do the cographs ordered by induced subgraphs.

== Constructing new wpo's from given ones ==
Let $X_1$ and $X_2$ be two disjoint wpo sets. Let $Y=X_1\cup X_2$, and define a partial order on $Y$ by letting $y_1\le_Y y_2$ if and only if $y_1,y_2\in X_i$ for the same $i\in\{1,2\}$ and $y_1 \le_{X_i} y_2$. Then $Y$ is wpo, and $o(Y) = o(X_1) \oplus o(X_2)$, where $\oplus$ denotes natural sum of ordinals.

Given wpo sets $X_1$ and $X_2$, define a partial order on the Cartesian product $Y=X_1\times X_2$, by letting $(a_1,a_2)\le_Y (b_1,b_2)$ if and only if $a_1\le_{X_1} b_1$ and $a_2\le_{X_2} b_2$. Then $Y$ is wpo (this is a generalization of Dickson's lemma), and $o(Y) = o(X_1)\otimes o(X_2)$, where $\otimes$ denotes natural product of ordinals.

Given a wpo set $X$, let $X^*$ be the set of finite sequences of elements of $X$, partially ordered by the subsequence relation. Meaning, let $(x_1,\ldots,x_n)\le_{X^*} (y_1,\ldots,y_m)$ if and only if there exist indices $1\le i_1<\cdots<i_n\le m$ such that $x_j \le_X y_{i_j}$ for each $1\le j\le n$. By Higman's lemma, $X^*$ is wpo. The ordinal type of $X^*$ is
$$o(X^*)=\begin{cases}\omega^{\omega^{o(X)-1}},&o(X) \text{ finite};\\ \omega^{\omega^{o(X)+1}},&o(X)=\varepsilon_\alpha+n \text{ for some }\alpha\text{ and some finite }n;\\ \omega^{\omega^{o(X)}},&\text{otherwise}.\end{cases}$$

Given a wpo set $X$, let $T(X)$ be the set of all finite rooted trees whose vertices are labeled by elements of $X$. Partially order $T(X)$ by the tree embedding relation. By Kruskal's tree theorem, $T(X)$ is wpo. This result is nontrivial even for the case $|X|=1$ (which corresponds to unlabeled trees), in which case $o(T(X))$ equals the small Veblen ordinal. In general, for $o(X)$ countable, we have the upper bound $o(T(X))\le\vartheta(\Omega^\omega o(X))$ in terms of the $\vartheta$ ordinal collapsing function. (The small Veblen ordinal equals $\vartheta(\Omega^\omega)$ in this ordinal notation.)

== Wqo's versus well partial orders ==
According to Milner 1985, no real gain in generality is obtained by considering quasi-orders rather than partial orders... it is simply more convenient to do so.

Observe that a wpo is a wqo, and that a wqo gives rise to a wpo between equivalence classes induced by the kernel of the wqo. For example, if we order $\Z$ by divisibility, we end up with $n\equiv m$ if and only if $n=\pm m$, so that $(\Z,|)\approx(\N,|)$.

== Infinite increasing subsequences ==
If $(X, \le)$ is wqo then every infinite sequence $x_0, x_1, x_2, \ldots,$ contains an infinite increasing subsequence $x_{n_0} \le x_{n_1}\le x_{n_2} \le \cdots$ (with $n_0< n_1< n_2< \cdots$). Such a subsequence is sometimes called perfect. This can be proved by a Ramsey argument: given some sequence $(x_i)_i$, consider the set $I$ of indexes $i$ such that $x_i$ has no larger or equal $x_j$ to its right, i.e., with $i<j$. If $I$ is infinite, then the $I$-extracted subsequence contradicts the assumption that $X$ is wqo. So $I$ is finite, and any $x_n$ with $n$ larger than any index in $I$ can be used as the starting point of an infinite increasing subsequence.

The existence of such infinite increasing subsequences is sometimes taken as a definition for well-quasi-ordering, leading to an equivalent notion.

== Properties of wqos ==
- Given a quasiordering $(X,\le)$ the quasiordering $(P(X), \le^+)$ defined by $A \le^+ B \iff \forall a \in A, \exists b \in B, a \le b$ is well-founded if and only if $(X,\le)$ is a wqo.
- A quasiordering is a wqo if and only if the corresponding partial order (obtained by quotienting by $x \sim y \iff x\le y \land y \le x$) has no infinite descending sequences or antichains. (This can be proved using a Ramsey argument as above.)
- Given a well-quasi-ordering $(X,\le)$, any sequence of upward-closed subsets $S_0 \subseteq S_1 \subseteq \cdots \subseteq X$ eventually stabilises (meaning there exists $n \in \N$ such that $S_n = S_{n+1} = \cdots$; a subset $S \subseteq X$ is called upward-closed if $\forall x,y \in X, x \le y \wedge x \in S \Rightarrow y \in S$): assuming the contrary $\forall i \in \N, \exists j \in \N, j > i, \exists x \in S_j \setminus S_i$, a contradiction is reached by extracting an infinite non-ascending subsequence.
- Given a well-quasi-ordering $(X,\le)$, any subset $S$ of $X$ has a finite number of minimal elements with respect to $\le$, for otherwise the minimal elements of $S$ would constitute an infinite antichain.

== See also ==
- Better-quasi-ordering
- Prewellordering – Set theory concept
- Well-order – Class of mathematical orderings
