= Abstract elementary class =

In model theory, a discipline within mathematical logic, an abstract elementary class, or AEC for short, is a class of models with a partial order similar to the relation of an elementary substructure of an elementary class in first-order model theory. They were introduced by Saharon Shelah.

== Definition ==
$\langle K, \prec_K\rangle$, for $K$ a class of structures in some language $L = L(K)$, is an AEC if it has the following properties:

- $\prec_K$ is a partial order on $K$.
- If $M\prec_K N$ then $M$ is a substructure of $N$.
- Isomorphisms: $K$ is closed under isomorphisms, and if $M,N,M',N'\in K,$ $f\colon M\simeq M',$ $g\colon N\simeq N',$ $f\subseteq g,$ and $M\prec_K N,$ then $M'\prec_K N'.$
- Coherence: If $M_1\prec_K M_3,$ $M_2\prec_K M_3,$ and $M_1\subseteq M_2,$ then $M_1\prec_K M_2.$
- Tarski–Vaught chain axioms: If $\gamma$ is an ordinal and $\{\,M_\alpha\mid \alpha<\gamma\,\}\subseteq K$ is a chain (i.e. $\alpha<\beta<\gamma\implies M_\alpha\prec_K M_\beta$), then:
  - $\bigcup_{\alpha<\gamma} M_\alpha\in K$
  - If $M_\alpha\prec_K N$, for all $\alpha<\gamma$, then $\bigcup_{\alpha<\gamma} M_\alpha\prec_K N$
- Löwenheim–Skolem axiom: There exists a cardinal $\mu \ge |L(K)| + \aleph_0$, such that if $A$ is a subset of the universe of $M$, then there is $N$ in $K$ whose universe contains $A$ such that $\|N\|\leq |A|+\mu$ and $N\prec_K M$. We let $\operatorname{LS}(K)$ denote the least such $\mu$ and call it the Löwenheim–Skolem number of $K$.

Note that we usually do not care about the models of size less than the Löwenheim–Skolem number and often assume that there are none (we will adopt this convention in this article). This is justified since we can always remove all such models from an AEC without influencing its structure above the Löwenheim–Skolem number.

A $K$-embedding is a map $f: M \rightarrow N$ for $M, N \in K$ such that $f[M] \prec_K N$ and $f$ is an isomorphism from $M$ onto $f[M]$. If $K$ is clear from context, we omit it.

== Examples ==
The following are examples of abstract elementary classes:

- An Elementary class is the most basic example of an AEC: If T is a first-order theory, then the class $\operatorname{Mod}(T)$ of models of T together with elementary substructure forms an AEC with Löwenheim–Skolem number |T|.
- If $\phi$ is a sentence in the infinitary logic $L_{\omega_1, \omega}$, and $\mathcal{F}$ is a countable fragment containing $\phi$, then $\langle \operatorname{Mod}(T), \prec_{\mathcal{F}} \rangle$ is an AEC with Löwenheim–Skolem number $\aleph_0$. This can be generalized to other logics, like $L_{\kappa, \omega}$, or $L_{\omega_1, \omega}(Q)$, where $Q$ expresses "there exists uncountably many".
- If T is a first-order countable superstable theory, the set of $\aleph_1$-saturated models of T, together with elementary substructure, is an AEC with Löwenheim–Skolem number $2^{\aleph_0}$.
- Zilber's pseudo-exponential fields form an AEC.

== Common assumptions ==
AECs are very general objects and one usually make some of the assumptions below when studying them:

- An AEC has joint embedding if any two model can be embedded inside a common model.
- An AEC has no maximal model if any model has a proper extension.
- An AEC $K$ has amalgamation if for any triple $M_0, M_1, M_2 \in K$ with $M_0 \prec_K M_1$, $M_0 \prec_K M_2$, there is $N \in K$ and embeddings of $M_1$ and $M_2$ inside $N$ that fix $M_0$ pointwise.

Note that in elementary classes, joint embedding holds whenever the theory is complete, while amalgamation and no maximal models are well-known consequences of the compactness theorem. These three assumptions allow us to build a universal model-homogeneous monster model $\mathfrak{C}$, exactly as in the elementary case.

Another assumption that one can make is tameness.

== Shelah's categoricity conjecture ==
Shelah introduced AECs to provide a uniform framework in which to generalize first-order classification theory. Classification theory started with Morley's categoricity theorem, so it is natural to ask whether a similar result holds in AECs. This is Shelah's eventual categoricity conjecture. It states that there should be a Hanf number for categoricity:

For every AEC K there should be a cardinal $\mu$ depending only on $\operatorname{LS}(K)$ such that if K is categorical in some $\lambda \geq \mu$ (i.e. K has exactly one (up to isomorphism) model of size $\lambda$), then K is categorical in $\theta$ for all $\theta \ge \mu$.

Shelah also has several stronger conjectures: The threshold cardinal for categoricity is the Hanf number of pseudoelementary classes in a language of cardinality LS(K). More specifically when the class is in a countable language and axiomatizable by an $L_{\omega_1,\omega}$ sentence the threshold number for categoricity is $\beth_{\omega_1}$. This conjecture dates back to 1976.

Several approximations have been published (see for example the results section below), assuming set-theoretic assumptions (such as the existence of large cardinals or variations of the generalized continuum hypothesis), or model-theoretic assumptions (such as amalgamation or tameness). As of 2014, the original conjecture remains open.

== Results ==
The following are some important results about AECs. Except for the last, all results are due to Shelah.

- Shelah's Presentation Theorem: Any AEC $K$ is $\operatorname{PC}_{2^{\operatorname{LS}(K)}}$: it is a reduct of a class of models of a first-order theory omitting at most $2^{\operatorname{LS}(K)}$ types.
- Hanf number for existence: Any AEC $K$ which has a model of size $\beth_{(2^{\operatorname{LS}(K)})^+}$ has models of arbitrarily large sizes.
- Amalgamation from categoricity: If K is an AEC categorical in $\lambda$ and $\lambda^+$ and $2^\lambda < 2^{\lambda^+}$, then K has amalgamation for models of size $\lambda$.
- Existence from categoricity: If K is a $\operatorname{PC}_{\aleph_0}$ AEC with Löwenheim–Skolem number $\aleph_0$ and K is categorical in $\aleph_0$ and $\aleph_1$, then K has a model of size $\aleph_2$. In particular, no sentence of $L_{\omega_1, \omega}(Q)$ can have exactly one uncountable model.
- Approximations to Shelah's categoricity conjecture:
  - Downward transfer from a successor: If K is an abstract elementary class with amalgamation that is categorical in a "high-enough" successor $\lambda$, then K is categorical in all high-enough $\mu \le \lambda$.
  - Shelah's categoricity conjecture for a successor from large cardinals: If there are class-many strongly compact cardinals, then Shelah's categoricity conjecture holds when we start with categoricity at a successor.

== See also ==
- Tame abstract elementary class
