= David E. Joyce =

American mathematician

- Education: University of Pennsylvania
- Known for: Introducing quandles in knot theory Online edition of Euclid's Elements
- Scientific career
- Fields: Topology
- Workplaces: Clark University
- Doctoral advisor: Peter J. Freyd

David Edward Joyce is an American mathematician known for introducing quandles in knot theory, and for his online interactive edition of Euclid's Elements. He is a professor emeritus of mathematics at Clark University.

Joyce completed his Ph.D. in 1979 at the University of Pennsylvania, with the dissertation An Algebraic Approach to Symmetry with Applications to Knot Theory supervised by Peter J. Freyd. His doctoral dissertation introduced quandles, and his work in this area was published in 1982, the same year as the independent publication of these structures under another name by Sergei Matveev.

He created his online edition of Euclid's Elements in 1996, using Java applets to create interactive diagrams, with the dual purpose of creating more interest in Euclid's work and of showing off the capabilities of the Java programming language for mathematical illustration.
