= Roland Fraïssé =

French mathematician (1920–2008)

- Born: 12 March 1920; Bressuire, France
- Died: 30 March 2008 (aged 88); Marseille, France
- Education: University of Paris
- Known for: Ehrenfeucht–Fraïssé games, Fraïssé limit
- Scientific career
- Fields: Mathematics
- Workplaces: University of Provence
- Thesis: Sur quelques classifications des systèmes de relations (1953)
- Doctoral advisor: René de Possel

Roland Fraïssé (French: [ʁɔlɑ̃ fʁajse]; 12 March 1920 – 30 March 2008) was a French mathematical logician.

== Life ==
Fraïssé received his doctoral degree from the University of Paris in 1953. In his thesis, Fraïssé used the back-and-forth method to determine whether two model-theoretic structures were elementarily equivalent. This method of determining elementary equivalence was later formulated as the Ehrenfeucht–Fraïssé game.

Fraïssé worked primarily in relation theory. Another of his important works was the Fraïssé construction of a Fraïssé limit of finite structures.

He also formulated Fraïssé's conjecture on order embeddings, and introduced the notion of compensor in the theory of posets.

Most of his career was spent as Professor at the University of Provence in Marseille, France.

== Selected publications ==
- Sur quelques classifications des systèmes de relations, thesis, University of Paris, 1953; published in Publications Scientifiques de l'Université d'Alger, series A 1 (1954), 35–182.
- Cours de logique mathématique, Paris: Gauthier-Villars Éditeur, 1967; second edition, 3 vols., 1971–1975; tr. into English and ed. by David Louvish as Course of Mathematical Logic, 2 vols., Dordrecht: Reidel, 1973–1974.
- Theory of relations, tr. into English by P. Clote, Amsterdam: North-Holland, 1986; rev. ed. 2000.
