= Sacks property =

In mathematical set theory, the Sacks property holds between two models of Zermelo–Fraenkel set theory if they are not "too dissimilar" in the following sense.

For $M$ and $N$ transitive models of set theory, $N$ is said to have the Sacks property over $M$ if and only if for every function $g\in M$ mapping $\omega$ to $\omega\setminus\{0\}$ such that $g$ diverges to infinity, and every function $f\in N$ mapping $\omega$ to $\omega$ there is a tree $T\in M$ such that for every $n$ the $n^{th}$ level of $T$ has cardinality at most $g(n)$ and $f$ is a branch of $T$.

The Sacks property is used to control the value of certain cardinal invariants in forcing arguments. It is named for Gerald Enoch Sacks.

A forcing notion is said to have the Sacks property if and only if the forcing extension has the Sacks property over the ground model. Examples include Sacks forcing and Silver forcing.

Shelah proved that when proper forcings with the Sacks property are iterated using countable supports, the resulting forcing notion will have the Sacks property as well.

The Sacks property is equivalent to the conjunction of the Laver property and the ${}^\omega\omega$-bounding property.
