= Mostowski =

Mostowski (feminine: Mostowska, plural: Mostowscy) is a surname. It may refer to:

- Mostowski Palace (Polish: Pałac Mostowskich), an 18th-century palace in Warsaw
- Andrzej Mostowski (1913 - 1975), a Polish mathematician
  - Mostowski collapse lemma, in mathematical logic
  - Ehrenfeucht–Mostowski theorem, in model theory
  - Mostowski model in set theory

== See also ==
- Mostovsky
