= Laver property =

In mathematical set theory, the Laver property holds between two models if they are not "too dissimilar", in the following sense.

For $M$ and $N$ transitive models of set theory, $N$ is said to have the Laver property over $M$ if and only if for every function $g\in M$ mapping $\omega$ to $\omega\setminus\{0\}$ such that $g$ diverges to infinity, and every function $f\in N$ mapping $\omega$ to $\omega$ and every function $h\in M$ which bounds $f$, there is a tree $T\in M$ such that each branch of $T$ is bounded by $h$ and for every $n$ the $n^\text{th}$ level of $T$ has cardinality at most $g(n)$ and $f$ is a branch of $T$.

A forcing notion is said to have the Laver property if and only if the forcing extension has the Laver property over the ground model. Examples include Laver forcing.

The concept is named after Richard Laver.

Saharon Shelah proved that when proper forcings with the Laver property are iterated using countable supports, the resulting forcing notion will have the Laver property as well.

The conjunction of the Laver property and the ${}^\omega\omega$-bounding property is equivalent to the Sacks property.

== See also ==
- Forcing (mathematics)
- Proper forcing
- Descriptive set theory
- Cardinal characteristic of the continuum
- Combinatorial set theory
