= Set theory of the real line =

Area of mathematics

Set theory of the real line is an area of mathematics concerned with the application of set theory to aspects of the real numbers.

For example, one knows that all countable sets of reals are null, i.e. have Lebesgue measure 0; one might therefore ask the least possible size of a set which is not Lebesgue null. This invariant is called the uniformity of the ideal of null sets, denoted $non(\mathcal{N})$. There are many such invariants associated with this and other ideals, e.g. the ideal of meagre sets, plus more which do not have a characterisation in terms of ideals. If the continuum hypothesis (CH) holds, then all such invariants are equal to $\aleph_1$, the least uncountable cardinal. For example, we know $non(\mathcal{N})$ is uncountable, but being the size of some set of reals under CH it can be at most $\aleph_1$.

On the other hand, if one assumes Martin's Axiom (MA) all common invariants are "big", that is equal to $\mathfrak{c}$, the cardinality of the continuum. Martin's Axiom is consistent with $\mathfrak{c}>\aleph_1$. In fact one should view Martin's Axiom as a forcing axiom that negates the need to do specific forcings of a certain class (those satisfying the ccc, since the consistency of MA with large continuum is proved by doing all such forcings (up to a certain size shown to be sufficient). Each invariant can be made large by some ccc forcing, thus each is big given MA.

If one restricts to specific forcings, some invariants will become big while others remain small. Analysing these effects is the major work of the area, seeking to determine which inequalities between invariants are provable and which are inconsistent with ZFC. The inequalities among the ideals of measure (null sets) and category (meagre sets) are captured in Cichon's diagram. Seventeen models (forcing constructions) were produced during the 1980s, starting with work of Arnold Miller, to demonstrate that no other inequalities are provable. These are analysed in detail in the 1995 book by Tomek Bartoszynski and Haim Judah, two of the eminent workers in the field.

One curious result is that if you can cover the real line with $\kappa$ meagre sets (where $\aleph_1 \leq \kappa \leq \mathfrak{c}$) then $non(\mathcal{N}) \geq \kappa$; conversely if you can cover the real line with $\kappa$ null sets then the least non-meagre set has size at least $\kappa$; both of these results follow from the existence of a decomposition of $\mathbb{R}$ as the union of a meagre set and a null set.

One of the last great unsolved problems of the area was the consistency of

$$\mathfrak{d} < \mathfrak{a},$$

proved in 1998 by Saharon Shelah.

== See also ==
- Cichoń's diagram
- Cardinal invariant
