= Tomek Bartoszyński =

Polish-American mathematician (born 1957)

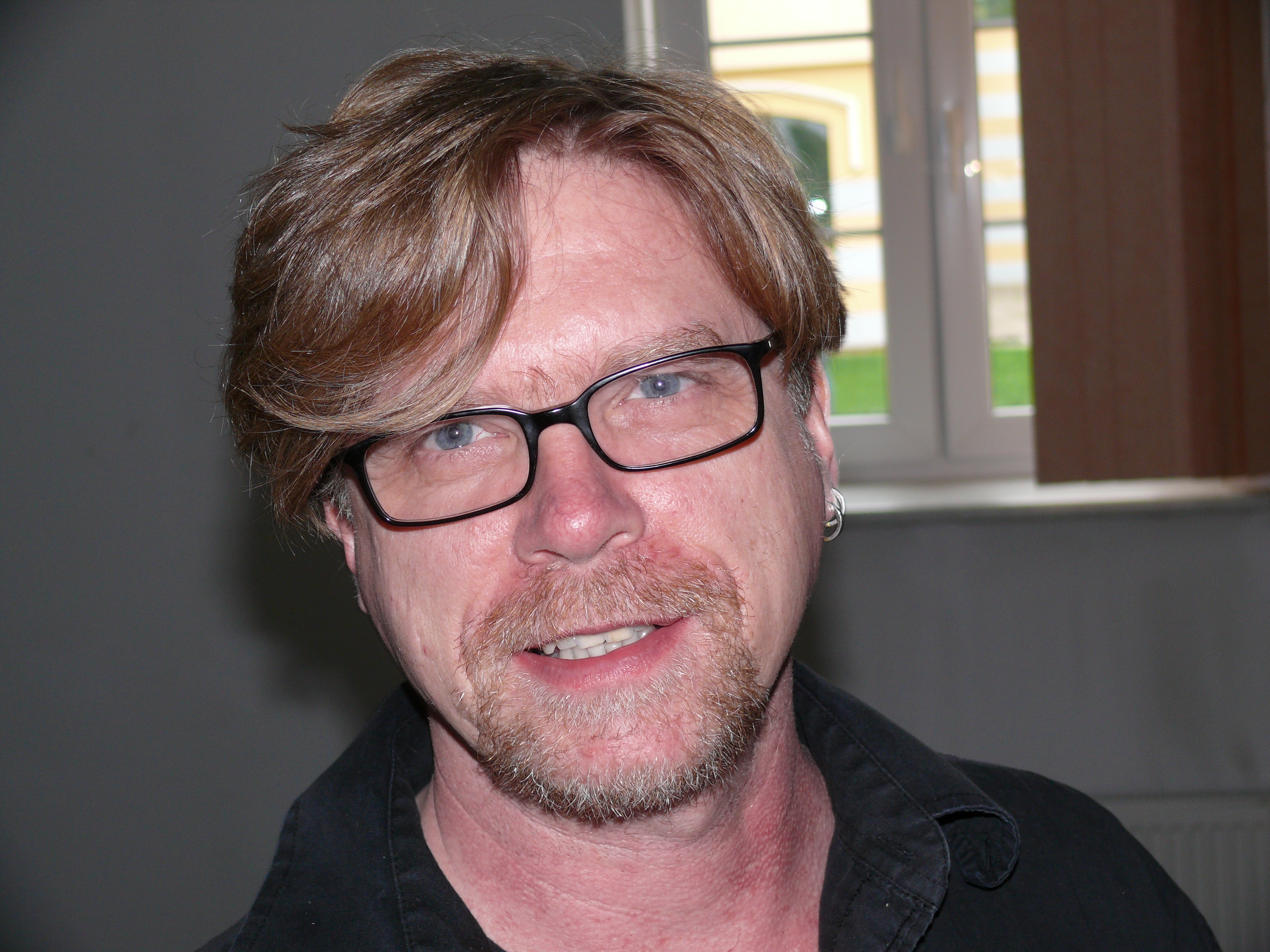
- Bartoszyński during The First European Set Theory Meeting, Będlewo (Poland), July 2007
- Born: 16 May 1957 (age 69); Warsaw
- Known for: Set theory, set theory of the real line, forcing
- Scientific career
- Fields: Mathematician
- Workplaces: National Science Foundation
- Doctoral advisor: Wojciech Guzicki

Tomasz "Tomek" Bartoszyński (born 16 May 1957) is a Polish-American mathematician who works in set theory.

== Biography ==
Bartoszyński studied mathematics at the University of Warsaw from 1976 to 1981, and worked there from 1981 to 1987. In 1984, he defended his Ph.D. thesis Combinatorial aspects of measure and category; his advisor was Wojciech Guzicki. In 2004, he received his habilitation from the Polish Academy of Sciences.

From 1986 onward, he worked in the United States: he taught at the University of California, Berkeley and University of California, Davis. From 1990 to 2006, he was a professor (full professor from 1998-2006) at Boise State University.

In 1990-1991, he visited the Hebrew University of Jerusalem as a fellow of the Lady Davis foundation, and in 1996/97 he visited the Free University of Berlin as a Humboldt fellow. Currently, he is one of the program directors at the National Science Foundation (NSF), responsible for combinatorics, foundations, and probability.

== Family ==
His father, Robert Bartoszyński, is a statistician.

His wife, Joanna Kania-Bartoszyńska, is the NSF program director for topology and geometric analysis.

== Scientific work ==
Bartoszyński's work is mainly concerned with forcing, specifically with applications of forcing to the set theory of the real line. He has written about 50 papers in this field, as well as a monograph:

- Tomek Bartoszyński and Haim Judah: Set theory. On the structure of the real line. A K Peters, Ltd., Wellesley, MA, 1995; ISBN 1-56881-044-X

== See also ==
- Cichoń's diagram
- Baire property
