= Steve Simpson (mathematician) =

American mathematician

Stephen G. Simpson
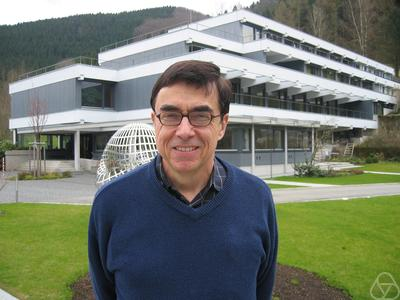
- Steve Simpson at Oberwolfach, 2008
- Born: September 8, 1945 (age 80)
- Education: MIT
- Known for: Reverse mathematics
- Scientific career
- Fields: Mathematics
- Workplaces: Pennsylvania State University Vanderbilt University
- Thesis: Admissible Ordinals and Recursion Theory
- Doctoral advisor: Gerald Sacks
- Doctoral students: John R. Steel

Stephen George Simpson (born September 8, 1945) is an American mathematician whose research concerns the foundations of mathematics, including work in mathematical logic, recursion theory, and Ramsey theory. He is known for his extensive development of the field of reverse mathematics founded by Harvey Friedman, in which the goal is to determine which axioms are needed to prove certain mathematical theorems. He has also argued for the benefits of finitistic mathematical systems, such as primitive recursive arithmetic, which do not include actual infinity.

A conference in honor of Simpson's 70th birthday was organized in May 2016.

== Education ==
Simpson graduated in 1966 from Lehigh University with a B.A. (summa cum laude) and M.A. in mathematics. He earned a Ph.D. from the Massachusetts Institute of Technology in 1971, with a dissertation entitled Admissible Ordinals and Recursion Theory and supervised by Gerald Sacks.

== Career ==
After short-term positions at Yale University, the University of California, Berkeley, and the University of Oxford, Simpson became an assistant professor at the Pennsylvania State University in 1975. At Penn State, he was Raymond N. Shibley professor from 1987 to 1992.

In 2016, his wife, computer scientist Padma Raghavan, moved from Penn State to Vanderbilt University to become vice provost for research, and Simpson followed her, becoming a research professor at Vanderbilt.

== Selected publications ==
- Simpson, Stephen G. (1977), "First order theory of the degrees of recursive unsolvability", Annals of Mathematics, 105 (1): 121–139, doi:10.2307/1971028, JSTOR 1971028, MR 0432435.
- Friedman, Harvey M.; Simpson, Stephen G.; Smith, Rick L. (1983), "Countable algebra and set existence axioms", Annals of Pure and Applied Logic, 25 (2): 141–181, doi:10.1016/0168-0072(83)90012-X, MR 0725732.
- Carlson, Timothy J.; Simpson, Stephen G. (1984), "A dual form of Ramsey's theorem", Advances in Mathematics, 53 (3): 265–290, doi:10.1016/0001-8708(84)90026-4, MR 0753869.
- Simpson, Stephen G. (1988), "Partial realizations of Hilbert's Program", Journal of Symbolic Logic, 53 (2): 349–363, doi:10.2307/2274508, JSTOR 2274508, MR 0947843.
- Simpson, Stephen G. (1999), Subsystems of second order arithmetic, Perspectives in Mathematical Logic, Berlin: Springer-Verlag, doi:10.1007/978-3-642-59971-2 (inactive 12 July 2025), ISBN 3-540-64882-8, MR 1723993. 2nd ed., 2009, MR 2517689.
