= Permutation model =

Model of set theory constructed using permutations

In mathematical set theory, a permutation model is a model of set theory with atoms (ZFA) constructed using a group of permutations of the atoms. A symmetric model is similar except that it is a model of ZF (without atoms) and is constructed using a group of permutations of a forcing poset. One application is to show the independence of the axiom of choice from the other axioms of ZFA or ZF. Permutation models were introduced by Fraenkel (1922) and developed further by Mostowski (1938). Symmetric models were introduced by Paul Cohen.

== Construction of permutation models ==
Suppose that A is a set of atoms, and G is a group of permutations of A. A normal filter of G is a collection F of subgroups of G such that

- G is in F
- The intersection of two elements of F is in F
- Any subgroup containing an element of F is in F
- Any conjugate of an element of F is in F
- The subgroup fixing any element of A is in F.

If V is a model of ZFA with A the set of atoms, then an element of V is called symmetric if the subgroup fixing it is in F, and is called hereditarily symmetric if it and all elements of its transitive closure are symmetric. The permutation model consists of all hereditarily symmetric elements, and is a model of ZFA.

== Construction of filters on a group ==
A filter on a group can be constructed from an invariant ideal on the Boolean algebra of subsets of A containing all elements of A. Here an ideal is a collection I of subsets of A closed under taking finite unions and subsets, and is called invariant if it is invariant under the action of the group G. For each element S of the ideal one can take the subgroup of G consisting of all elements fixing every element S. These subgroups generate a normal filter of G.
