= Makkai =

Makkai is a surname. Notable people with the surname include:

- Michael Makkai (born 1939), Canadian mathematician
- Rebecca Makkai (born 1978), American writer
