= Amoeba (disambiguation) =

Amoeba (sometimes amœba or ameba, plural amoebae, amoebas or amebas) is a type of cell or organism which has the ability to alter its shape, primarily by extending and retracting pseudopods.

Amoeba or variants may also refer to:

== Biology ==
- Amoeba (genus), a genus of single-celled protists in the family Amoebidae
- Amoebozoa, a large group of protists that includes the genus Amoeba

== Arts and entertainment ==
- Amoeba Music, an independent music chain
- Amoeba (band), an experimental music group with Robert Rich and Rick Davies
- Amoeba (album), a 1991 album by the band Critters Buggin
- "Amoeba" (song), a 1981 song by the Adolescents
- "Amoeba", a 2019 song by Clairo from Sling
- Amoeba (2016 film), a Malayalam film
- Amoeba (2025 film), a film by Tan Siyou

== Other uses ==
- Ameba (website), a Japanese social networking website
- Amoeba (mathematics), a certain type of set
- Amoeba order, a mathematical construction in set theory
- Amoeba (operating system)
- Amoeba defense, a basketball strategy
- Amoeba method, a type of downhill search algorithm for finding minima (optima)
- Amoeba Management, a management system designed by Kyocera founder Kazuo Inamori
