= Rasiowa–Sikorski lemma =

Mathematical lemma

In axiomatic set theory, the Rasiowa–Sikorski lemma named after Helena Rasiowa and Roman Sikorski is one of the most fundamental facts used in the technique of forcing. In the area of forcing, a subset E of a poset (P, ≤) is called dense in P if for any p ∈ P there is e ∈ E with e ≤ p. If D is a set of dense subsets of P, then a filter F in P is called D-generic if

F ∩ E ≠ ∅ for all E ∈ D.

Now we can state the Rasiowa–Sikorski lemma:

Let (P, ≤) be a poset and p ∈ P. If D is a countable set of dense subsets of P then there exists a D-generic filter F in P such that p ∈ F.

== Proof of the Rasiowa–Sikorski lemma ==
Let p ∈ P be given. Since D is countable, D = { D_{i} | i ∈ N }, i.e., one can enumerate the dense subsets of P as D_{1}, D_{2}, ... and, by density, there exists p_{1} ≤ p with p_{1} ∈ D_{1}. Iterating that, one gets ... ≤ p_{2} ≤ p_{1} ≤ p with p_{i} ∈ D_{i}. Then G = { q ∈ P | ∃i. q ≥ p_{i} } is a D-generic filter.

The Rasiowa–Sikorski lemma can be viewed as an equivalent to a weaker form of Martin's axiom. More specifically, it is equivalent to MA(ℵ_{0}) and to the axiom of countable choice.

== Examples ==
- For (P, ≤) = (Func(X, Y), ⊇), the poset of partial functions from X to Y, reverse-ordered by inclusion, define D_{x} = { s ∈ P | x ∈ dom(s) }. Let D = { D_{x} | x ∈ X }. If X is countable, the Rasiowa–Sikorski lemma yields a D-generic filter F and thus a function F: X → Y.
- If we adhere to the notation used in dealing with D-generic filters, { H ∪ G_{0} | P_{ij}P_{t} } forms an H-generic filter.
- If D is uncountable, but of cardinality strictly smaller than 2^{ℵ_{0}} and the poset has the countable chain condition, we can instead use Martin's axiom. However, Martin's axiom is not provable in ZFC.
