= Cardinal characteristic of the continuum =

Set theory concept

In the mathematical discipline of set theory, a cardinal characteristic of the continuum is an infinite cardinal number that may consistently lie strictly between $\aleph_0$ (the cardinality of the set of natural numbers), and the cardinality of the continuum, that is, the cardinality of the set $\mathbb R$ of all real numbers. The latter cardinal is denoted $2^{\aleph_0}$ or $\mathfrak c$. A variety of such cardinal characteristics arise naturally, and much work has been done in determining what relations between them are provable, and constructing models of set theory for various consistent configurations of them.

== Background ==
Cantor's diagonal argument shows that $\mathfrak c$ is strictly greater than $\aleph_0$, but it does not specify whether it is the least cardinal greater than $\aleph_0$ (that is, $\aleph_1$). Indeed the assumption that $\mathfrak c = \aleph_1$ is the well-known continuum hypothesis, which was shown to be consistent with the standard ZFC axioms for set theory by Kurt Gödel and to be independent of them by Paul Cohen. If the continuum hypothesis fails and so $\mathfrak c$ is at least $\aleph_2$, natural questions arise about the cardinals strictly between $\aleph_0$ and $\mathfrak c$, for example regarding Lebesgue measurability. By considering the least cardinal with some property, one may get a definition for an uncountable cardinal that is consistently less than $\mathfrak c$. Generally one only considers definitions for cardinals that are provably greater than $\aleph_0$ and at most $\mathfrak c$ as cardinal characteristics of the continuum, so if the continuum hypothesis holds they are all equal to $\aleph_1$.

== Examples ==
As is standard in set theory, we denote by $\omega$ the least infinite ordinal, which has cardinality $\aleph_0$; it may be identified with the set of natural numbers.

A number of cardinal characteristics naturally arise as cardinal invariants for ideals that are closely connected with the structure of the reals, such as the ideal of Lebesgue null sets and the ideal of meagre sets.

=== non(N) ===
The cardinal characteristic $\text{non}(\mathcal{N})$ is the least cardinality of a non-measurable set; equivalently, it is the least cardinality of a set that is not a Lebesgue null set.

=== Bounding number and dominating number ===
We denote by $\omega^\omega$ the set of functions from $\omega$ to $\omega$. For any two functions $f:\omega\to\omega$ and $g:\omega\to\omega$ we denote by $f \leq^* g$ the statement that for all but finitely many $n\in\omega, f(n) \leq g(n)$. The bounding number $\mathfrak b$ is the least cardinality of an unbounded set in this relation, that is, $\mathfrak b = \min(\{|F| : F\subseteq\omega^\omega \land \forall g:\omega\to\omega \,\exists f \in F (f \nleq^* g)\}).$

The dominating number $\mathfrak d$ is the least cardinality of a set of functions from $\omega$ to $\omega$ such that every such function is dominated by (that is, $\leq^*$) a member of that set, that is, $\mathfrak d = \min(\{|F| : F\subseteq\omega^\omega \land \forall g:\omega\to\omega \,\exists f \in F (g \leq^* f)\}).$

Clearly any such dominating set $F$ is unbounded, so $\mathfrak b$ is at most $\mathfrak d$, and a diagonalisation argument shows that $\mathfrak b>\aleph_0$. Of course if $\mathfrak c=\aleph_1$ this implies that $\mathfrak b=\mathfrak d=\aleph_1$, but Hechler has shown that it is also consistent to have $\mathfrak b$ strictly less than $\mathfrak d .$

=== Splitting number and reaping number ===
We denote by $[\omega]^\omega$ the set of all infinite subsets of $\omega$. For any $a,b\in[\omega]^\omega$, we say that $a$ splits $b$ if both $b \cap a$ and $b \setminus a$ are infinite. The splitting number $\mathfrak s$ is the least cardinality of a subset $S$ of $[\omega]^\omega$ such that for all $b\in[\omega]^\omega$, there is some $a\in S$ such that $a$ splits $b$. That is, $\mathfrak s = \min(\{|S| : S\subseteq[\omega]^\omega \land \forall b\in[\omega]^\omega \exists a \in S (|b \cap a| = \aleph_0 \land |b \setminus a| = \aleph_0)\}).$

The reaping number $\mathfrak r$ is the least cardinality of a subset $R$ of $[\omega]^\omega$ such that no element $a$ of $[\omega]^\omega$ splits every element of $R$. That is, $\mathfrak r = \min(\{|R| : R\subseteq[\omega]^\omega \land \forall a\in[\omega]^\omega \exists b \in R (|b \cap a|<\aleph_0 \lor |b \setminus a|<\aleph_0)\}).$

=== Ultrafilter number ===
The ultrafilter number $\mathfrak u$ is defined to be the least cardinality of a filter base of a non-principal ultrafilter on $\omega$. Kunen gave a model of set theory in which $\mathfrak u = \aleph_1$ but $\mathfrak c = \aleph_{\omega_1},$ and using a countable support iteration of Sacks forcings, Baumgartner and Laver constructed a model in which $\mathfrak u = \aleph_1$ and $\mathfrak c = \aleph_2$.

=== Almost disjointness number ===
Two subsets $A$ and $B$ of $\omega$ are said to be almost disjoint if $|A\cap B|$ is finite, and a family of subsets of $\omega$ is said to be almost disjoint if its members are pairwise almost disjoint. A maximal almost disjoint ("mad") family of subsets of $\omega$ is thus an almost disjoint family $\mathcal{A}$ such that for every subset $X$ of $\omega$ not in $\mathcal{A}$, there is a set $A\in\mathcal{A}$ such that $A$ and $X$ are not almost disjoint (that is, their intersection is infinite). The almost disjointness number $\mathfrak{a}$ is the least cardinality of an infinite maximal almost disjoint family. A basic result is that $\mathfrak{b}\leq\mathfrak{a}$; Shelah showed that it is consistent to have the strict inequality $\mathfrak{b}<\mathfrak{a}$.

== Cichoń's diagram ==
A well-known diagram of cardinal characteristics is Cichoń's diagram, showing all pairwise relations provable in ZFC between 10 cardinal characteristics.
