= List of forcing notions =

In mathematics, forcing is a method of constructing new models M[G] of set theory by adding a generic subset G of a poset P to a model M. The poset P used will determine what statements hold in the new universe (the 'extension'); to force a statement of interest thus requires construction of a suitable P. This article lists some of the posets P that have been used in this construction.

== Notation ==
- P is a poset with order <
- V is the universe of all sets
- M is a countable transitive model of set theory
- G is a generic subset of P over M.

== Definitions ==
- P satisfies the countable chain condition if every antichain in P is at most countable. This implies that V and V[G] have the same cardinals (and the same cofinalities).
- A subset D of P is called dense if for every p ∈ P there is some q ∈ D with q ≤ p.
- A filter on P is a nonempty subset F of P such that if p < q and p ∈ F then q ∈ F, and if p ∈ F and q ∈ F then there is some r ∈ F with r ≤ p and r ≤ q.
- A subset G of P is called generic over M if it is a filter that meets every dense subset of P in M.

== Amoeba forcing ==
Amoeba forcing is forcing with the amoeba order, and adds a measure 1 set of random reals.

== Cohen forcing ==
In Cohen forcing (named after Paul Cohen) P is the set of functions from a finite subset of ω_{2} × ω to {0,1} and p < q if p ⊇ q.

This poset satisfies the countable chain condition. Forcing with this poset adds ω_{2} distinct reals to the model; this was the poset used by Cohen in his original proof of the independence of the continuum hypothesis.

More generally, one can replace ω_{2} by any cardinal κ so construct a model where the continuum has size at least κ. Here, there is no restriction. If κ has cofinality ω, the cardinality of the reals ends up bigger than κ.

== Grigorieff forcing ==
Grigorieff forcing (after Serge Grigorieff) destroys a free ultrafilter on ω.

== Hechler forcing ==
Hechler forcing (after Stephen Herman Hechler) is used to show that Martin's axiom implies that every family of less than c functions from ω to ω is eventually dominated by some such function.

P is the set of pairs (s, E) where s is a finite sequence of natural numbers (considered as functions from a finite ordinal to ω) and E is a finite subset of some fixed set G of functions from ω to ω. The element (s, E) is stronger than (t, F) if t is contained in s, F is contained in E, and if k is in the domain of s but not of t then s(k) > h(k) for all h in F.

== Iterated forcing ==
Iterated forcing with finite supports was introduced by Solovay and Tennenbaum to show the consistency of Suslin's hypothesis. Easton introduced another type of iterated forcing to determine the possible values of the continuum function at regular cardinals. Iterated forcing with countable support was investigated by Laver in his proof of the consistency of Borel's conjecture, Baumgartner, who introduced Axiom A forcing, and Shelah, who introduced proper forcing. Revised countable support iteration was introduced by Shelah to handle semi-proper forcings, such as Prikry forcing, and generalizations, notably including Namba forcing.

== Jockusch–Soare forcing ==
Forcing with $\Pi^0_1$ classes was invented by Robert Soare and Carl Jockusch to prove, among other results, the low basis theorem. Here P is the set of nonempty $\Pi^0_1$ subsets of $2^{\omega}$ (meaning the sets of paths through infinite, computable subtrees of $2^{<\omega}$), ordered by inclusion. While most forcing notions on this page relate to set theory, this one relates to recursion theory.

== Laver forcing ==
Laver forcing was used by Laver to show that Borel's conjecture, which says that all strong measure zero sets are countable, is consistent with ZFC. (Borel's conjecture is not consistent with the continuum hypothesis.)

- P is the set of Laver trees, ordered by inclusion.

A Laver tree p is a subset of the finite sequences of natural numbers such that

- p is a tree: p contains any initial sequence of any element of p, equivalently stated as p is closed under initial segments
- p has a stem: a maximal node s(p) = s ∈ p such that s ≤ t or t ≤ s for all t in p,
- If t ∈ p and s ≤ t then t has an infinite number of immediate successors tn in p for n ∈ ω.

If G is generic for (P, ≤), then the real {s(p) : p ∈ G}, called a Laver-real, uniquely determines G.

Laver forcing satisfies the Laver property.

== Laver preparation ==
The Laver preparation was introduced by Laver in the context of forcing while preserving large cardinal axioms. Specifically, if κ is a supercompact cardinal, then after forcing with the Laver preparation at κ, κ remains a supercompact cardinal, and moreover will still remain so after any further κ-directed-closed forcing.

The Laver preparation P_{κ} on κ is an Easton support iteration of length κ, guided by a Laver function f. This is a function such that for any x in V, there is a λ-supercompactness embedding j with critical point κ (for suitable λ) such that j(f)(κ)=x; Laver shows that such a function exists for every supercompact cardinal κ. The iteration P_{κ} only has non-trivial forcing at certain stages α for which f(α) is a suitable name for an α-directed-closed forcing, in which case f(α) is used as the stage α forcing.

== Levy collapsing ==
These posets will collapse various cardinals, in other words force them to be equal in size to smaller cardinals.

- Collapsing a cardinal to ω: P is the set of all finite sequences of ordinals less than a given cardinal λ. If λ is uncountable then forcing with this poset collapses λ to ω.
- Collapsing a cardinal to another: P is the set of all functions from a subset of κ of cardinality less than κ to λ (for fixed cardinals κ and λ). Forcing with this poset collapses λ down to κ.
- Levy collapsing: If κ is regular and λ is inaccessible, then P is the set of functions p on subsets of λ × κ with domain of size less than κ and p(α, ξ) < α for every (α, ξ) in the domain of p. This poset collapses all cardinals less than λ onto κ, but keeps λ as the successor to κ.

Levy collapsing is named for Azriel Levy.

== Magidor forcing ==
Amongst many forcing notions developed by Magidor, one of the best known is a generalization of Prikry forcing used to change the cofinality of a cardinal to a given smaller regular cardinal.

== Mathias forcing ==
- An element of P is a pair consisting of a finite set s of natural numbers and an infinite set A of natural numbers such that every element of s is less than every element of A. The order is defined by

(t, B) is stronger than (s, A) ((t, B) < (s, A)) if s is an initial segment of t, B is a subset of A, and t is contained in s ∪ A.

Mathias forcing is named for Adrian Mathias.

== Namba forcing ==
Namba forcing (after Kanji Namba) is used to change the cofinality of ω_{2} to ω without collapsing ω_{1}.

- P is the set of all trees $T \subseteq \omega_2^{<\omega}$ (nonempty downward closed subsets of the set of finite sequences of ordinals less than ω_{2}) which have the property that any s in T has an extension in T which has $\aleph_2$ immediate successors. P is ordered by inclusion (i.e., subtrees are stronger conditions). The intersection of all trees in the generic filter defines a countable sequence which is cofinal in ω_{2}.

Namba′ forcing is the subset of P such that there is a node below which the ordering is linear and above which each node has $\aleph_2$ immediate successors.

Magidor and Shelah proved that if CH holds then a generic object of Namba forcing does not exist in the generic extension by Namba′, and vice versa.

== Prikry forcing ==
In Prikry forcing (after Karel Prikrý) P is the set of pairs (s, A) where s is a finite subset of a fixed measurable cardinal κ, and A is an element of a fixed normal measure D on κ. A condition (s, A) is stronger than (t, B) if t is an initial segment of s, A is contained in B, and s is contained in t ∪ B. This forcing notion can be used to change the cofinality of κ while preserving all cardinals.

== Product forcing ==
Taking a product of forcing conditions is a way of simultaneously forcing all the conditions.

- Finite products: If P and Q are posets, the product poset P × Q has the partial order defined by (p_{1}, q_{1}) ≤ (p_{2}, q_{2}) if p_{1} ≤ p_{2} and q_{1} ≤ q_{2}.
- Infinite products: The product of a set of posets P_{i}, i ∈ I, each with a largest element 1 is the set of functions p on I with p(i) ∈ P(i) and such that p(i) = 1 for all but a finite number of i. The order is given by p ≤ q if p(i) ≤ q(i) for all i.
- The Easton product (after William Bigelow Easton) of a set of posets P_{i}, i ∈ I, where I is a set of cardinals is the set of functions p on I with p(i) ∈ P(i) and such that for every regular cardinal γ the number of elements α of γ with p(α) ≠ 1 is less than γ.

== Radin forcing ==
Radin forcing (after Lon Berk Radin), a technically involved generalization of Magidor forcing, adds a closed, unbounded subset to some regular cardinal λ.

If λ is a sufficiently large cardinal, then the forcing keeps λ regular, measurable, supercompact, etc.

== Random forcing ==
- P is the set of Borel subsets of [0,1] of positive measure, where p is called stronger than q if it is contained in q. The generic set G then encodes a "random real": the unique real x_{G} in all rational intervals [r, s]^{V[G]} such that [r, s]^{V} is in G. This real is "random" in the sense that if X is any subset of [0, 1]^{V} of measure 1, lying in V, then x_{G} ∈ X.

== Sacks forcing ==
- P is the set of all perfect trees contained in the set of finite {0, 1} sequences. (A tree T is a set of finite sequences containing all initial segments of its members, and is called perfect if for any element t of T there is a segment s extending t so that both s0 and s1 are in T.) A tree p is stronger than q if p is contained in q. Forcing with perfect trees was used by Gerald Enoch Sacks to produce a real a with minimal degree of constructibility.

Sacks forcing has the Sacks property.

== Shooting a fast club ==
For S a stationary subset of $\omega_1$ we set $P=\{\langle \sigma, C\rangle\,\colon\sigma$ is a closed sequence from S and C is a closed unbounded subset of $\omega_1\}$, ordered by $\langle \sigma',C'\rangle\leq\langle\sigma, C\rangle$ iff $\sigma'$ end-extends $\sigma$ and $C'\subseteq C$ and $\sigma'\subseteq\sigma\cup C$. In $V[G]$, we have that $\bigcup\{\sigma\,\colon(\exists C)(\langle\sigma,C\rangle\in G)\}$ is a closed unbounded subset of S almost contained in each club set in V. $\aleph_1$ is preserved. This method was introduced by Ronald Jensen in order to show the consistency of the continuum hypothesis and the Suslin hypothesis.

== Shooting a club with countable conditions ==
For S a stationary subset of $\omega_1$ we set P equal to the set of closed countable sequences from S. In $V[G]$, we have that $\bigcup G$ is a closed unbounded subset of S and $\aleph_1$ is preserved, and if CH holds then all cardinals are preserved.

== Shooting a club with finite conditions ==
For S a stationary subset of $\omega_1$ we set P equal to the set of finite sets of pairs of countable ordinals, such that if $p\in P$ and $\langle\alpha,\beta\rangle\in p$ then $\alpha\leq\beta$ and $\alpha\in S$, and whenever $\langle\alpha,\beta\rangle$ and $\langle\gamma,\delta\rangle$ are distinct elements of p then either $\beta<\gamma$ or $\delta<\alpha$. P is ordered by reverse inclusion. In $V[G]$, we have that $\{\alpha\,\colon(\exists\beta)(\langle\alpha,\beta\rangle\in\bigcup G)\}$ is a closed unbounded subset of S and all cardinals are preserved.

== Silver forcing ==
Silver forcing (after Jack Howard Silver) is the set of all those partial functions from the natural numbers into {0, 1} whose domain is coinfinite; or equivalently the set of all pairs (A, p), where A is a subset of the natural numbers with infinite complement, and p is a function from A into a fixed 2-element set. A condition q is stronger than a condition p if q extends p.

Silver forcing satisfies Fusion, the Sacks property, and is minimal with respect to reals (but not minimal).

== Vopěnka forcing ==
Vopěnka forcing (after Petr Vopěnka) is used to generically add a set $A$ of ordinals to ${\color{blue}\text{HOD}}$. Define first $P'$ as the set of all non-empty $\text{OD}$ subsets of the power set $\mathcal{P}(\alpha)$ of $\alpha$, where $A\subseteq\alpha$, ordered by inclusion: $p\leq q$ iff $p\subseteq q$. Each condition $p\in P'$ can be represented by a tuple $(\beta,\gamma,\varphi)$ where $x\in p\Leftrightarrow V_\beta\models\varphi(\gamma,x)$, for all $x\subseteq\alpha$. The translation between $p$ and its least representation is $\text{OD}$, and hence $P'$ is isomorphic to a poset $P\in\text{HOD}$ (the conditions being the minimal representations of elements of $P'$). This poset is the Vopenka forcing for subsets of $\alpha$. Defining $G_A$ as the set of all representations for elements $p\in P'$ such that $A\in p$, then $G_A$ is $\text{HOD}$-generic and $A\in\text{HOD}[G_A]$.
