= Andrzej Mostowski =

Polish mathematician (1913–1975)

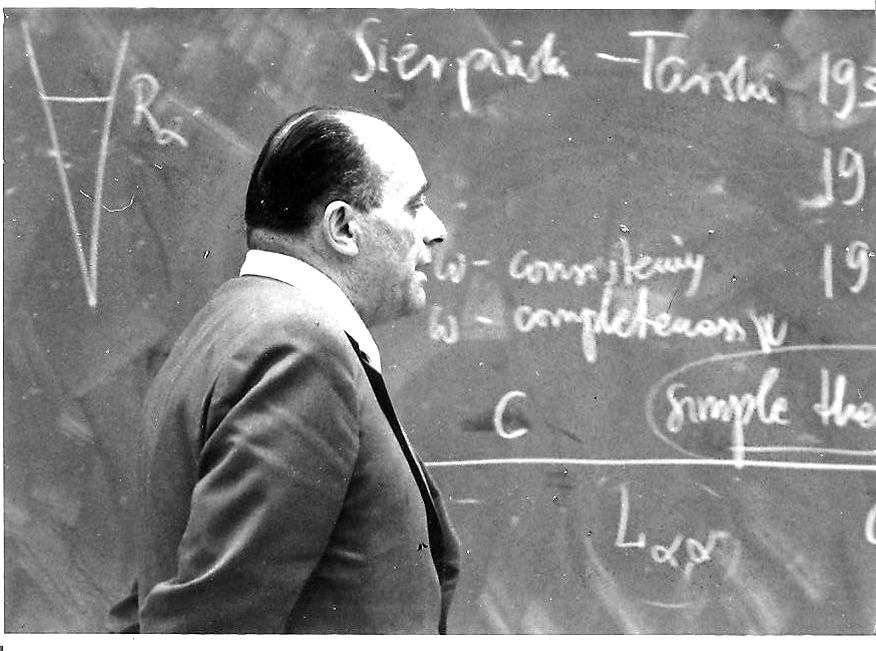
- Mostowski in 1973
- Born: 1 November 1913; Lemberg, Austria-Hungary
- Died: 22 August 1975 (aged 61); Vancouver, British Columbia, Canada
- Education: University of Warsaw
- Known for: Kleene–Mostowski hierarchy Mostowski collapse lemma Mostowski model Ehrenfeucht–Mostowski theorem Permutation model
- Scientific career
- Fields: Mathematics
- Workplaces: University of Warsaw
- Thesis: On the Independence of Finitenesss Definitions in a System of Logic (1938)
- Doctoral advisors: Kazimierz Kuratowski; Alfred Tarski
- Doctoral students: Andrzej Ehrenfeucht; Moshé Machover; Helena Rasiowa; Roman Sikorski; Victor W. Marek; Krzysztof R. Apt; Andrzej Grzegorczyk; Stanisław Krajewski; Michael Makkai; Janusz Onyszkiewicz; Wojciech Guzicki; Andrzej Zarach

Andrzej Mostowski (Polish: [mɔsˈtɔfskʲi]; 1 November 1913 – 22 August 1975) was a Polish mathematician. He worked primarily in logic and foundations of mathematics and is perhaps best remembered for the Mostowski collapse lemma. He was a member of the Polish Academy of Sciences and a representative of the Warsaw School of Mathematics.

== Biography ==
Born in Lemberg, Austria-Hungary, Mostowski entered the University of Warsaw in 1931. He was influenced by Kuratowski, Lindenbaum, and Tarski. In 1938, he obtained his doctorate on the basis of his dissertation O niezależności definicji skończoności w systemie logiki (On the Independence of Finitenesss Definitions in a System of Logic). It was officially supervised by Kazimierz Kuratowski but in practice by Alfred Tarski who was a young lecturer at that time.

He became an accountant after the German invasion of Poland but continued working in the Underground Warsaw University. After the Warsaw Uprising of 1944, the Nazis tried to put him in a concentration camp. With the help of some Polish nurses, he escaped to a hospital, choosing to take bread with him rather than his notebook containing his research. He managed to reconstruct some of this research after the war, however much of it remained lost.

From 1948 to 1949, he spent the academic year at the Institute for Advanced Study at Princeton, re-establishing his contacts with Kurt Gödel. He subsequently came back to Warsaw where he served as head of the foundations of mathematics department at the Mathematics Institute of the Polish Academy of Sciences.

In 1954 Mostowski was awarded by Knight's Cross of the Order of Polonia Restituta. In 1960, he became a member of the Polish Mathematical Society. In 1963, Mostowski was elected a full member of the Polish Academy of Sciences and in 1973, a member of the Finnish Academy of Sciences. After the World War II he supervised Rasiowa's both master and doctoral theses in logic and the foundations of mathematics. His other notable students included Andrzej Ehrenfeucht, Andrzej Grzegorczyk, Moshé Machover, Michael Makkai, Janusz Onyszkiewicz, and Roman Sikorski.

His work was largely on recursion theory and undecidability. From 1946 until his death in Vancouver, British Columbia, Canada, he worked at the University of Warsaw. Much of his work, during that time, was on first order logic and model theory. He also worked at the State Institute of Mathematics, which was incorporated into the Polish Academy of Sciences in 1952.

His son Tadeusz is also a mathematician working on differential geometry. With Krzysztof Kurdyka and Adam Parusinski, Tadeusz Mostowski solved René Thom's gradient conjecture in 2000.

He died suddenly on 22 August 1975 while on his way to a scientific conference in Burnaby, Canada, where he was about to deliver a lecture at Simon Fraser University.

== See also ==
- List of Polish mathematicians
- Mostowski model

== Works ==
=== Books ===
- 1968 & 1976: (with Kazimierz Kuratowski) Set Theory. With an Introduction to Descriptive Set Theory, Studies in Logic and Foundations of Mathematics #86, North Holland, MR 0485384
- 1952: Sentences Undecidable in Formalized Arithmetic: An Exposition of the Theory of Kurt Godel, North-Holland, Amsterdam, ISBN 978-0313231513
- 1969: Constructible Sets with Applications, North-Holland, Amsterdam.

=== Papers ===
- Andrzej Mostowski, "Über die Unabhängigkeit des Wohlordnungssatzes vom Ordnungsprinzip." Fundamenta Mathematicae Vol. 32, No.1, ss. 201-252, (1939).
- Andrzej Mostowski, "On definable sets of positive integers", Fundamenta Mathematicae Vol. 34, No. 1, ss. 81-112, (1947).
- Andrzej Mostowski, "Un théorème sur les nombres cos 2πk/n", Colloquium Mathematicae Vol. 1, No. 3, ss. 195-196, (1948).
- Casimir Kuratowski, Andrzej Mostowski, "Sur un problème de la théorie des groupes et son rapport à la topologie", Colloquium Mathematicae Vol. 2, No. 3-4, ss. 212-215, (1951).
- Andrzej Mostowski, "Groups connected with Boolean algebras. (Partial solution of the problem P92)", Colloquium Mathematicae Vol. 2, No. 3-4, ss. 216-219, (1951).
- Andrzej Mostowski, "On direct products of theories", Journal of Symbolic Logic, Vol. 17, No. 1, ss. 1-31, (1952).
- Andrzej Mostowski, "Models of axiomatic systems", Fundamenta Mathematicae Vol. 39, No. 1, ss. 133-158, (1952).
- Andrzej Mostowski, "On a system of axioms which has no recursively enumerable arithmetic model", Fundamenta Mathematicae Vol. 40, No. 1, ss. 56-61, (1953).
- Andrzej Mostowski, "A formula with no recursively enumerable model", Fundamenta Mathematicae Vol. 42, No. 1, ss. 125-140, (1955).
- Andrzej Mostowski, "Examples of sets definable by means of two and three quantifiers", Fundamenta Mathematicae Vol. 42, No. 2, ss. 259-270, (1955).
- Andrzej Mostowski, "Contributions to the theory of definable sets and functions", Fundamenta Mathematicae Vol. 42, No. 2, ss. 271-275, (1955).
- Andrzej Ehrenfeucht, Andrzej Mostowski, "Models of Axiomatic Theories Admitting Automorphisms", Fundamenta Mathematicae, Vol. 43, No. 1, ss. 50-68 (1956).
- Andrzej Mostowski, "L'oeuvre scientifique de Jan Łukasiewicz dans le domaine de la logique mathématique", Fundamenta Mathematicae Vol. 44, No. 1, ss. 1-11, (1957).
- Andrzej Mostowski, "On a generalization of quantifiers", Fundamenta Mathematicae Vol. 44, No. 1, ss. 12-36, (1957).
- Andrzej Mostowski, "On computable sequences", Fundamenta Mathematicae Vol. 44, No. 1, ss. 37-51, (1957).
- Andrzej Grzegorczyk, Andrzej Mostowski and Czesław Ryll-Nardzewski, "The classical and ω-complete arithmetic", Journal of Symbolic Logic Vol. 23, No. 2, ss. 188-206, (1958).
- Andrzej Mostowski, "On a problem of W. Kinna and K. Wagner", Colloquium Mathematicae Vol. 6, No. 1, ss. 207-208, (1958).
- Andrzej Mostowski, "A generalization of the incompleteness theorem", Fundamenta Mathematicae Vol. 49, No. 2, ss. 205-232, (1961).
- Andrzej Mostowski, "Axiomatizability of some many valued predicate calculi", Fundamenta Mathematicae Vol. 50, No. 2, ss. 165-190, (1961).
- Yoshindo Suzuki, Andrzej Mostowski, "On ω-models which are not β-models", Fundamenta Mathematicae Vol. 65, No. 1, ss. 83-93, (1969).
