= Ramified forcing =

In the mathematical discipline of set theory, ramified forcing is the original form of forcing introduced by Cohen (1963) to prove the independence of the continuum hypothesis from Zermelo–Fraenkel set theory. Ramified forcing starts with a model M of set theory in which the axiom of constructibility, V = L, holds, and then builds up a larger model M[G] of Zermelo–Fraenkel set theory by adding a generic subset G of a partially ordered set to M, imitating Kurt Gödel's constructible hierarchy.

Dana Scott and Robert Solovay realized that the use of constructible sets was an unnecessary complication, and could be replaced by a simpler construction similar to John von Neumann's construction of the universe as a union of sets V_{α} for ordinals α. Their simplification was originally called "unramified forcing" (Shoenfield 1971), but is now usually just called "forcing". As a result, ramified forcing is only rarely used.
