= Helena Rasiowa =

Polish mathematician (1917–1994)

- Born: 20 June 1917; Vienna, Austria-Hungary
- Died: 9 August 1994 (aged 77); Warsaw, Poland
- Education: University of Warsaw
- Known for: Rasiowa–Sikorski lemma
- Awards: Sierpiński Medal (1987)
- Scientific career
- Fields: Mathematics
- Doctoral advisor: Andrzej Mostowski
- Doctoral students: Ewa Orłowska

Helena Rasiowa (20 June 1917 – 9 August 1994) was a Polish mathematician. She worked in the foundations of mathematics and algebraic logic.

== Early years ==
Rasiowa was born in Vienna on 20 June 1917 to Polish parents. As soon as Poland regained its independence in 1918, the family settled in Warsaw. Helena's father was a railway specialist. She exhibited many different skills and interests, from music to business management and the most important of her interests, mathematics.

In 1938, the time was not very opportune for entering a university. Rasiowa had to interrupt her studies, as no legal education was possible in Poland after 1939. Many people fled the country, or at least they fled the big towns, which were subject to German bombardment and terror. The Rasiowa family fled also, as most high-ranking administration officials and members of the government were being evacuated to Romania. The family spent a year in Lviv. After the Soviet invasion in September 1939, the town was taken over by the Soviet Union. The lives of many Poles became endangered, so Helena's father decided to return to Warsaw.

== Academic development ==
Rasiowa became strongly influenced by Polish logicians. She wrote her Master's thesis under the supervision of Jan Łukasiewicz and Bolesław Sobociński. In 1944, the Warsaw Uprising broke out and consequently Warsaw was almost completely destroyed. This was not only due to the immediate fighting, but also because of the systematic destruction which followed the uprising after it had been suppressed. Rasiowa's thesis burned with the whole house. She herself survived with her mother in a cellar covered by the ruins of the demolished building.

After the war, Polish mathematics began to recover its institutions, its moods, and its people. Those who remained considered their duty to be the reconstruction of Polish universities and the scientific community. One of the important conditions for this reconstruction was to gather all those who could participate in re-creating mathematics. In the meantime, Rasiowa had accepted a teaching position in a secondary school. That is where she met Andrzej Mostowski and came back to the university. She re-wrote her Master's thesis in 1945 and in the next year she started her academic career as an assistant at the University of Warsaw, the institution she remained linked with for the rest of her life.

At the university, she prepared and defended her PhD thesis, Algebraic Treatment of the Functional Calculi of Lewis and Heyting, in 1950 under the guidance of Prof. Andrzej Mostowski. This thesis on algebraic logic initiated her career contributing to the Lwów–Warsaw school of logic: In 1956, she took her second academic degree, doktor nauk (equivalent to habilitation today) in the Institute of Mathematics of the Polish Academy of Sciences, where between 1954 and 1957, she held a post of associate professor, becoming a professor in 1957 and subsequently Full Professor in 1967. For the degree, she submitted two papers, Algebraic Models of Axiomatic Theories and Constructive Theories, which together formed a thesis named Algebraic Models of Elementary Theories and their Applications.

Rasiowa was pivotal in her role for inviting many international mathematicians, especially logicians, to Poland in the late '70s and early '80s, despite the country's instability at the time. According to Japanese mathematician Hiroakira Ono, she enabled collaboration through her iron will.

In 1987, Rasiowa became the recipient of the Sierpiński Medal conferred jointly by the Polish Mathematical Society and the University of Warsaw.

== Works ==
- 1963: (with Roman Sikorski) The Mathematics of Metamathematics
- 1974: An Algebraic Approach to Non-Classical Logics
