= Padma Raghavan =

Indian-born computer scientist

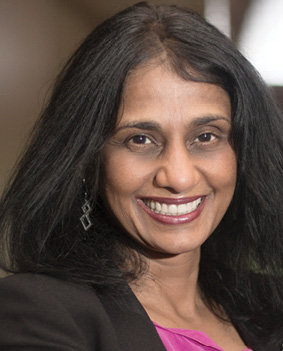
- Education: Pennsylvania State University; Indian Institute of Technology Kharagpur
- Scientific career
- Fields: Computer Science
- Workplaces: Vanderbilt University

Padma Raghavan is a computer scientist who works as the Chancellor's executive director for science and technology strategy at Vanderbilt University.

Raghavan graduated in 1985 from the Indian Institute of Technology Kharagpur. She earned her Ph.D. from Pennsylvania State University in 1991, with a dissertation on parallel algorithms for matrix decomposition supervised by Alex Pothen. She worked at the University of Tennessee and Oak Ridge National Laboratory, then returned as a faculty member to Penn State in 2000. At Penn State, she became a distinguished professor of computer science and engineering, associate vice president for research, and director of strategic initiatives. She moved to Vanderbilt in 2016, where she served as vice provost for research and innovation and chief research officer, as well as a senior advisor to the chancellor until July 2025. She is currently the Chancellor's Executive Director for Science and Technology Strategy and a Distinguished Professor of Computer Science at Vanderbilt University.

As a professor of computer science, Dr. Raghavan specializes in supercomputing, concentrating on the development of algorithms for fault-tolerant, energy-efficient, and scalable computing. Raghavan is the author of over one hundred peer-reviewed publications and has overseen approximately fifty M.S. and Ph.D theses throughout her career. In 2002, Raghavan won a Maria Goeppert Mayer Distinguished Scholar award, funding her to visit Argonne National Laboratory. She was a Computing Research Association CRA-W Distinguished Lecturer in 2010. She became a fellow of the IEEE in 2013. She was elected to the 2022 class of Fellows of the American Association for the Advancement of Science (AAAS). Raghavan remains active in her field, serving on the National Science Foundation's advisory committee for the Office of International Science and Engineering and the Council of Competitiveness's Technology Leadership and Strategy Initiative. Raghavan is also on the governing boards of UT-Battelle, which operates the Department of Energy's Oak Ridge National Laboratory, Southeastern University Research Association, which operates the Jefferson Lab, and the University-Industry Demonstration Partnership. President Biden also appointed Dr. Raghavan to serve a two-year term on the President's Committee on the National Medal of Science in 2022, which was renewed for an additional two-year term in 2024.

Raghavan's husband, mathematician Steve Simpson, moved with her from Penn State to Vanderbilt.
