= Amoeba order =

In mathematics, the amoeba order is the partial order of open subsets of 2^{ω} of measure less than 1/2, ordered by reverse inclusion. Amoeba forcing is forcing with the amoeba order; it adds a measure 1 set of random reals.

There are several variations, where 2^{ω} is replaced by the real numbers or a real vector space or the unit interval, and the number 1/2 is replaced by some positive number ε.

The name "amoeba order" come from the fact that a subset in the amoeba order can "engulf" a measure zero set by extending a "pseudopod" to form a larger subset in the order containing this measure zero set, which is analogous to the way an amoeba eats food.

The amoeba order satisfies the countable chain condition.
