= Sy Friedman =

Austrian American mathematician

Sy-David Friedman
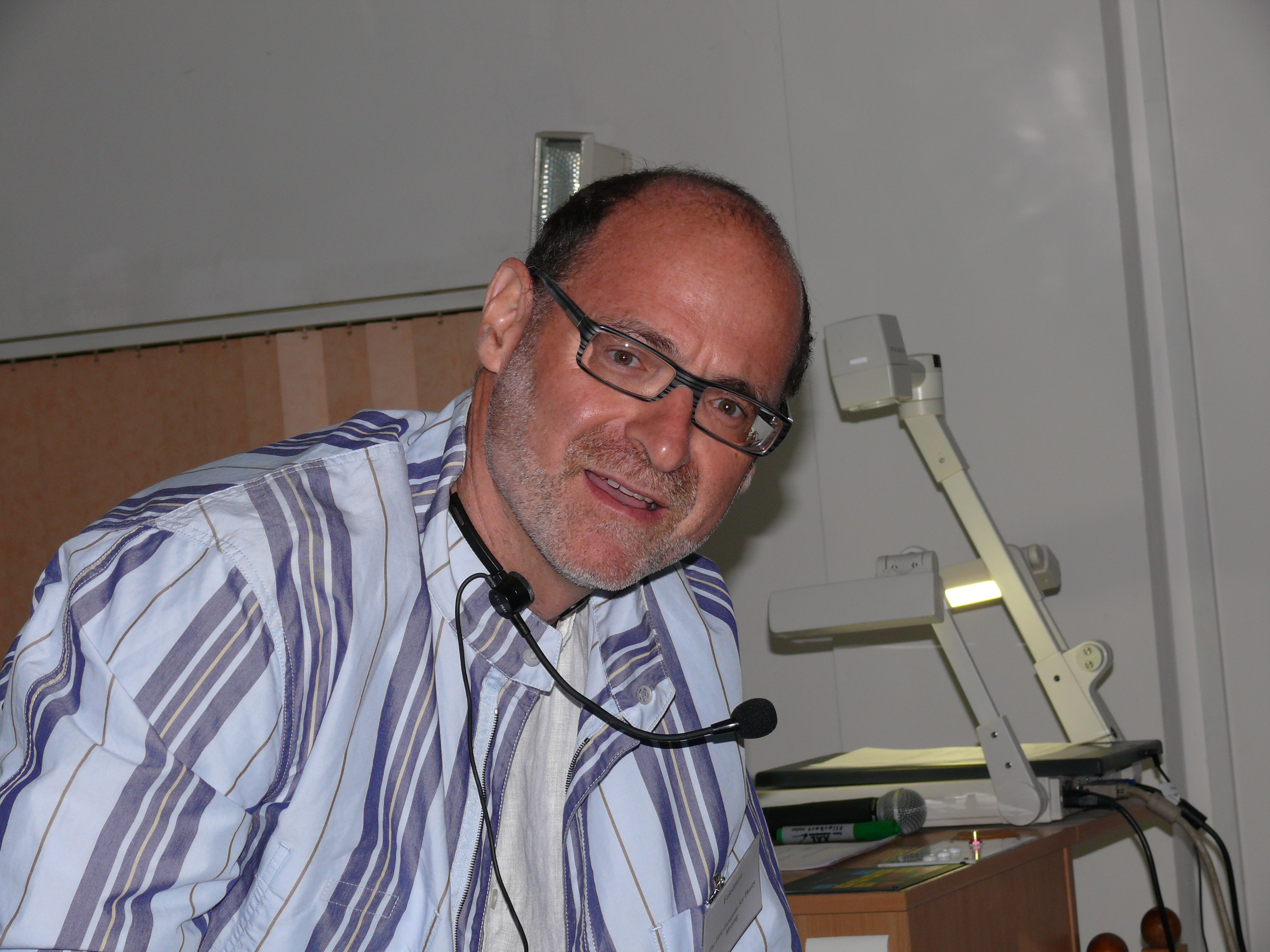
- Professor Sy Friedman before a lecture during The First European Set Theory Meeting, Będlewo (Poland), July 2007
- Born: May 6, 1953 (age 73); Chicago
- Education: MIT
- Known for: Mathematical logic, Set theory, Large cardinal property
- Scientific career
- Fields: Mathematician
- Workplaces: University of Vienna
- Doctoral advisor: Gerald E. Sacks

Sy-David Friedman (born May 23, 1953, in Chicago) is an American and Austrian mathematician and a (retired) professor of mathematics at the University of Vienna and the former director of the Kurt Gödel Research Center for Mathematical Logic. His main research interest lies in mathematical logic, in particular in set theory and recursion theory.

Friedman is the brother of Ilene Friedman and the brother of mathematician Harvey Friedman.

== Biography ==
He studied at Northwestern University and, from 1970, at the Massachusetts Institute of Technology. He received his Ph.D. in 1976 from MIT (his thesis Recursion on Inadmissible Ordinals was written under the supervision of Gerald E. Sacks).

In 1979, Sy Friedman accepted a position at MIT, and in 1990 he became a full professor there. Since 1999, he has been a professor of mathematical logic at the University of Vienna, and he retired in 2018. He is a Fellow of Collegium Invisibile.

== Selected publications and results ==
He has authored about 70 research articles, including:

- Friedman, Sy D. (1981). "Negative solutions to Post's problem. II". Annals of Mathematics. Second Series. 113 (1): 25–43. doi:10.2307/1971132. JSTOR 1971132.
- Friedman, Sy (1985). "A guide to "Coding the Universe" by Beller, Jensen, Welch". Journal of Symbolic Logic. 50 (4): 1002–1019. doi:10.2307/2273986. JSTOR 2273986.
- Friedman, Sy D. (1990). "The $\Pi^1_2$-singleton conjecture". J. Amer. Math. Soc. 3 (4): 771–791. doi:10.1090/S0894-0347-1990-1071116-6.
- Friedman, Sy D (2005). "Genericity and large cardinals". J. Math. Log. 5 (2): 149–166. doi:10.1142/S0219061305000420.

He also published a research monograph

- Friedman, Sy D. (2000). Fine structure and class forcing. de Gruyter Series in Logic and its Applications. Vol. 3. Berlin: Walter de Gruyter & Co. ISBN 978-3-11-016777-1.
