= Gerald Sacks =

American logician (1933–2019)

- Born: 1933; Brooklyn, New York, U.S.
- Died: 4 October 2019 (aged 85–86)
- Education: Cornell University
- Scientific career
- Fields: Recursion Theory; Mathematical Logic; Set Theory
- Workplaces: Harvard University; Massachusetts Institute of Technology
- Doctoral advisor: J. Barkley Rosser
- Doctoral students: Lenore Blum; Harvey Friedman; Sy Friedman; Leo Harrington; Richard Shore; Steve Simpson; Theodore Slaman

Gerald Enoch Sacks (1933 – October 4, 2019) was an American logician whose most important contributions were in recursion theory. Named after him is Sacks forcing, a forcing notion based on perfect sets and the Sacks Density Theorem, which asserts that the partial order of the recursively enumerable Turing degrees is dense. Sacks had a joint appointment as a professor at the Massachusetts Institute of Technology and at Harvard University starting in 1972 and became emeritus at M.I.T. in 2006 and at Harvard in 2012.

Sacks was born in Brooklyn in 1933. He earned his Ph.D. in 1961 from Cornell University under the direction of J. Barkley Rosser, with his dissertation On Suborderings of Degrees of Recursive Insolvability. Among his notable students are Lenore Blum, Harvey Friedman, Sy Friedman, Leo Harrington, Richard Shore, Steve Simpson and Theodore Slaman.

== Selected publications ==
- Degrees of unsolvability, Princeton University Press 1963, 1966
- Saturated Model Theory, Benjamin 1972; 2nd edition, World Scientific 2010
- Higher Recursion theory, Springer 1990
- Selected Logic Papers, World Scientific 1999
- Mathematical Logic in the 20th Century, World Scientific 2003
