= Mostovsky =

Inhabited locality name

Mostovsky (Russian: Мостовский) or Mostovskoy (Мостовской; both masculine), Mostovskaya (Мостовская; feminine), or Mostovskoye (Мостовское; neuter) is the name of several inhabited localities in Russia.

Urban localities

- Mostovskoy, Krasnodar Krai, an urban-type settlement in Mostovsky District of Krasnodar Krai

Rural localities

- Mostovskoy, Tula Oblast, a settlement in Shevelevskaya Rural Administration of Shchyokinsky District of Tula Oblast
- Mostovsky, Volgograd Oblast, a khutor in Tryasinovsky Selsoviet of Serafimovichsky District of Volgograd Oblast
- Mostovskoye, Krasnoyarsk Krai, a village in Mezhovsky Selsoviet of Bolshemurtinsky District of Krasnoyarsk Krai
- Mostovskoye, Shatrovsky District, Kurgan Oblast, a selo in Mostovsky Selsoviet of Shatrovsky District of Kurgan Oblast
- Mostovskoye, Vargashinsky District, Kurgan Oblast, a selo in Mostovskoy Selsoviet of Vargashinsky District of Kurgan Oblast
- Mostovskoye, Moscow Oblast, a village in Ryazanovskoye Rural Settlement of Podolsky District of Moscow Oblast
- Mostovskoye, Verkhnyaya Pyshma, Sverdlovsk Oblast, a selo under the administrative jurisdiction of the Town of Verkhnyaya Pyshma in Sverdlovsk Oblast
- Mostovskoye, Artyomovsky District, Sverdlovsk Oblast, a selo in Artyomovsky District, Sverdlovsk Oblast
