= Nice name =

In set theory, a nice name is used in forcing to impose an upper bound on the number of subsets in the generic model. It is used in the context of forcing to prove independence results in set theory such as Easton's theorem.

== Formal definition ==
Let $M \models$ ZFC be transitive, $(\mathbb{P}, <)$ a forcing notion in $M$, and suppose $G \subseteq \mathbb{P}$ is generic over $M$.

Then for any $\mathbb{P}$-name $\tau$ in $M$, we say that $\eta$ is a nice name for a subset of $\tau$ if $\eta$ is a $\mathbb{P}$-name satisfying the following properties:

(1) $\operatorname{dom}(\eta) \subseteq \operatorname{dom}(\tau)$

(2) For all $\mathbb{P}$-names $\sigma \in M$, $\{p \in \mathbb{P}| \langle\sigma, p\rangle \in \eta\}$ forms an antichain.

(3) (Natural addition): If $\langle\sigma, p\rangle \in \eta$, then there exists $q \geq p$ in $\mathbb{P}$ such that $\langle\sigma, q\rangle \in \tau$.
