= Roman Sikorski =

Polish mathematician (1920–1983)

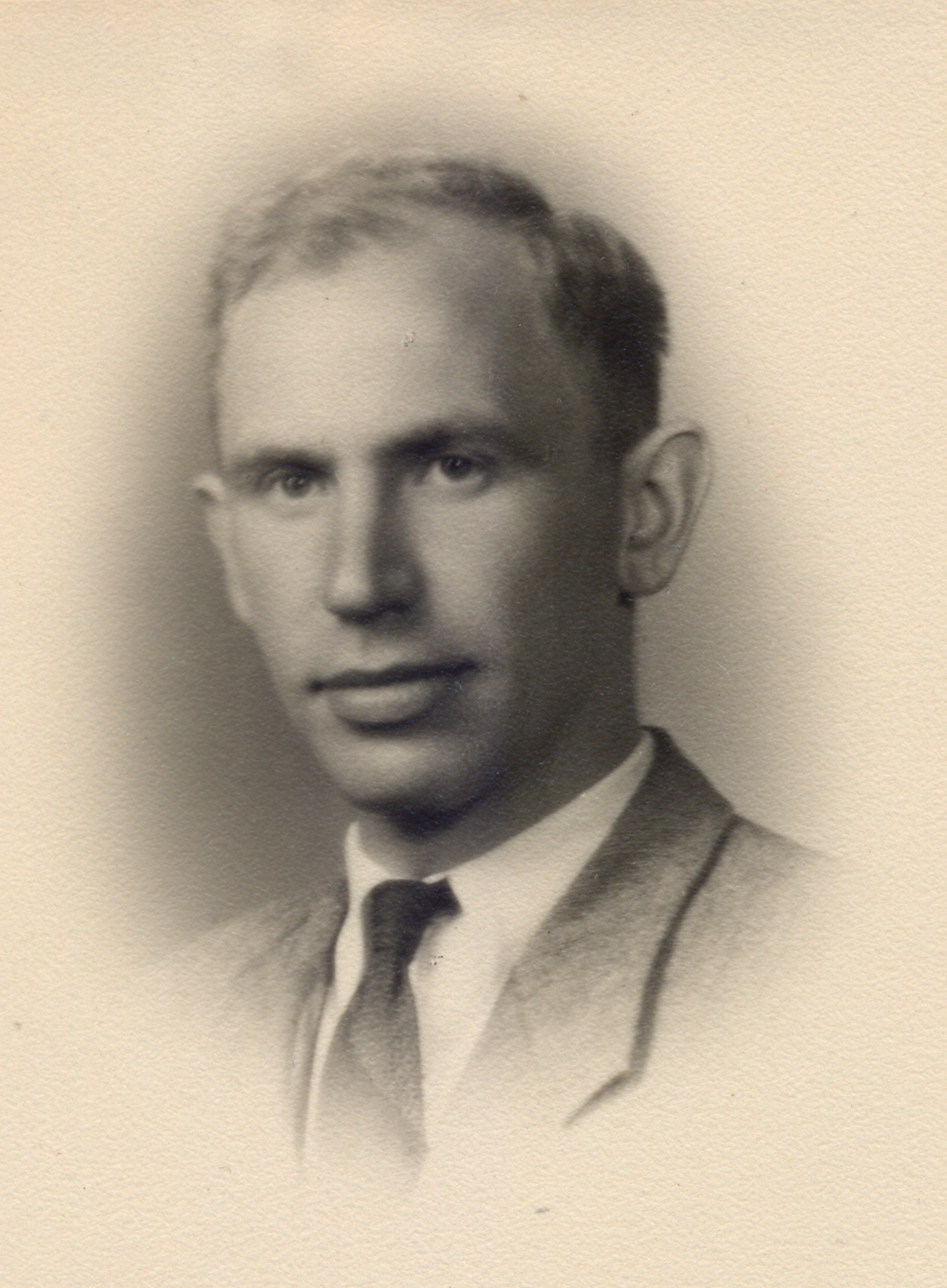
- c.1937
- Born: July 11, 1920; Mszczonów, Poland
- Died: September 12, 1983 (aged 63); Warsaw, Poland
- Education: University of Warsaw
- Known for: Rasiowa–Sikorski lemma Loomis-Sikorski theorem
- Scientific career
- Fields: Mathematics
- Workplaces: University of Warsaw
- Doctoral advisor: Andrzej Mostowski

Roman Sikorski (July 11, 1920 – September 12, 1983) was a Polish mathematician.

== Biography ==
Sikorski was a professor at the University of Warsaw from 1952 until 1982. Since 1962, he was a member of the Polish Academy of Sciences.

Sikorski's research interests included: Boolean algebras, mathematical logic, functional analysis, the theory of distributions, measure theory, general topology, and descriptive set theory.

== Works ==
- Boolean Algebras (1960)
- Funkcje rzeczywiste (t. 1–2 1958–59)
- The Mathematics of Metamathematics (1963, together with Helena Rasiowa)
- Rachunek rózniczkowy i całkowy — funkcje wielu zmiennych (1967)

== See also ==
- Warsaw School of Mathematics
