= Cichoń's diagram =

In set theory, Cichoń's diagram or Cichon's diagram is a table of 10 infinite cardinal numbers related to the set theory of the reals displaying the provable relations between these cardinal characteristics of the continuum. All these cardinals are greater than or equal to $\aleph_1$, the smallest uncountable cardinal, and they are bounded above by $2^{\aleph_0}$, the cardinality of the continuum. Four cardinals describe properties of the ideal of sets of measure zero; four more describe the corresponding properties of the ideal of meager sets (first category sets).

== Definitions ==
Let I be a proper ideal of a fixed infinite set X, containing all finite subsets of X. We define the following "cardinal coefficients" of I:

- $\operatorname{add}(I)=\min\{|{\mathcal A}|: {\mathcal A}\subseteq I \wedge \bigcup{\mathcal A}\notin I\big\}.$

The "additivity" of I is the smallest number of sets from I whose union is not in I. As any ideal is closed under finite unions, this number is always at least $\aleph_0$; if I is a σ-ideal, then add(I) ≥ $\aleph_1$.

- $\operatorname{cov}(I)=\min\{|{\mathcal A}|:{\mathcal A}\subseteq I \wedge\bigcup{\mathcal A} = X\big\}.$

The "covering number" of I is the smallest number of sets from I whose union is all of X. As X itself is not in I, we must have add(I) ≤ cov(I).

- $\operatorname{non}(I)=\min\{|\mathcal{A}|:\mathcal{A}\subseteq X\ \wedge\ \mathcal{A}\notin I\big\},$

The "uniformity number" of I (sometimes also written $\operatorname{unif}(I)$) is the size of the smallest set not in I. By our assumption on I, add(I) ≤ non(I).

- $\operatorname{cof}(I)=\min\{|{\mathcal A}|:{\mathcal A}\subseteq I \wedge (\forall B\in I)(\exists A\in {\mathcal A})(B\subseteq A)\big\}.$

The "cofinality" of I is the cofinality of the partial order (I, ⊆). It is easy to see that we must have non(I) ≤ cof(I) and cov(I) ≤ cof(I).

Furthermore, the "bounding number" or "unboundedness number" ${\mathfrak b}$ and the "dominating number" ${\mathfrak d}$ are defined as follows:

- ${\mathfrak b}=\min\big\{|F|:F\subseteq{\mathbb N}^{\mathbb N}\ \wedge\ (\forall g\in {\mathbb N}^{\mathbb N})(\exists f\in F)(\exists^\infty n\in{\mathbb N})(g(n)<f(n))\big\},$
- ${\mathfrak d}=\min\big\{|F|:F\subseteq{\mathbb N}^{\mathbb N}\ \wedge\ (\forall g\in{\mathbb N}^{\mathbb N})(\exists f\in F)(\forall^\infty n\in{\mathbb N})(g(n)<f(n))\big\},$

where "$\exists^\infty n\in{\mathbb N}$" means: "there are infinitely many natural numbers n such that …", and "$\forall^\infty n\in{\mathbb N}$" means "for all except finitely many natural numbers n we have …".

== Diagram ==
Let ${\mathcal B}$ be the σ-ideal of those subsets of the real line that are meager (or "of the first category") in the euclidean topology, and let ${\mathcal L}$ be the σ-ideal of those subsets of the real line that are of Lebesgue measure zero. Then the following inequalities hold:

		$\operatorname{cov}(\mathcal L)$	$\longrightarrow$	$\operatorname{non}(\mathcal B)$	$\longrightarrow$	$\operatorname{cof}(\mathcal B)$	$\longrightarrow$	$\operatorname{cof}(\mathcal L)$	$\longrightarrow$	$2^{\aleph_0}$
				$\uparrow$		$\uparrow$
		$\Bigg\uparrow$		$\mathfrak b$	$\longrightarrow$	$\mathfrak d$		$\Bigg\uparrow$
				$\uparrow$		$\uparrow$
$\aleph_1$	$\longrightarrow$	$\operatorname{add}{(\mathcal L)}$	$\longrightarrow$	$\operatorname{add}{(\mathcal B)}$	$\longrightarrow$	$\operatorname{cov}{(\mathcal B)}$	$\longrightarrow$	$\operatorname{non}{(\mathcal L)}$

Where an arrow from $x$ to $y$ is to mean that $x\le y$. In addition, the following relations hold:

$\operatorname{add}({\mathcal B})=\min\{\operatorname{cov}({\mathcal B}),{\mathfrak b}\}$ and

$\operatorname{cof}({\mathcal B})=\max\{\operatorname{non}({\mathcal B}),{\mathfrak d}\}.$

It turns out that the inequalities described by the diagram, together with the relations mentioned above, are all the relations between these cardinals that are provable in ZFC, in the following limited sense. Let A be any assignment of the cardinals $\aleph_1$ and $\aleph_2$ to the 10 cardinals in Cichoń's diagram. Then if A is consistent with the diagram's relations, and if A also satisfies the two additional relations, then A can be realized in some model of ZFC.

For larger continuum sizes, the situation is less clear. It is consistent with ZFC that all of the Cichoń's diagram cardinals are simultaneously different apart from $\operatorname{add}({\mathcal B})$ and $\operatorname{cof}({\mathcal B})$ (which are equal to other entries).

Some inequalities in the diagram (such as "add ≤ cov") follow immediately from the definitions. The inequalities $\operatorname{cov}({\mathcal B}) \le \operatorname{non}({\mathcal L})$ and $\operatorname{cov}({\mathcal L}) \le \operatorname{non}({\mathcal B})$ are classical theorems and follow from the fact that the real line can be partitioned into a meager set and a set of measure zero.

== Remarks ==
The British mathematician David Fremlin named the diagram after the Polish mathematician from Wrocław, Jacek Cichoń.

The continuum hypothesis, of $2^{\aleph_0}$ being equal to $\aleph_1$, would make all of these relations equalities.

Martin's axiom, a weakening of the continuum hypothesis, implies that all cardinals in the diagram (except perhaps $\aleph_1$) are equal to $2^{\aleph_0}$.

Similar diagrams can be drawn for cardinal characteristics of higher cardinals $\kappa$ for $\kappa$ strongly inaccessible, which assort various cardinals between $\kappa^+$ and $2^\kappa$.
