= Idempotent measure =

In mathematics, an idempotent measure on a metric group is a probability measure that equals its convolution with itself; in other words, an idempotent measure is an idempotent element in the topological semigroup of probability measures on the given metric group.

Explicitly, given a metric group X and two probability measures μ and ν on X, the convolution μ ∗ ν of μ and ν is the measure given by

$$(\mu * \nu) (A) = \int_{X} \mu (A x^{-1}) \, \mathrm{d} \nu (x) = \int_{X} \nu (x^{-1} A) \, \mathrm{d} \mu (x)$$

for any Borel subset A of X. (The equality of the two integrals follows from Fubini's theorem.) With respect to the topology of weak convergence of measures, the operation of convolution makes the space of probability measures on X into a topological semigroup. Thus, μ is said to be an idempotent measure if μ ∗ μ = μ.

It can be shown that the only idempotent probability measures on a complete, separable metric group are the normalized Haar measures of compact subgroups.
