= Harvey Friedman (mathematician) =

American mathematician (born 1948)

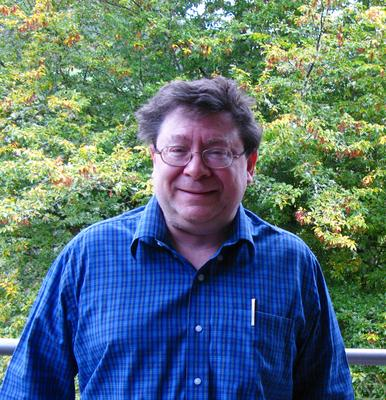
- Born: 23 September 1948 (age 77)
- Education: Massachusetts Institute of Technology
- Scientific career
- Fields: Mathematics, Logic
- Thesis: Subsystems of Analysis (1967)
- Doctoral advisors: Gerald Sacks

Harvey Friedman (born 23 September 1948) is an American mathematical logician at Ohio State University in Columbus, Ohio. He has worked on reverse mathematics, a project intended to derive the axioms of mathematics from the theorems considered to be necessary. In recent years, this has advanced to a study of Boolean relation theory, which attempts to justify large cardinal axioms by demonstrating their necessity for deriving certain propositions considered "concrete".

== Biography ==
Friedman is the brother of mathematician Sy Friedman. Friedman earned his Ph.D. from the Massachusetts Institute of Technology in 1967, at age 19, with a dissertation on Subsystems of Analysis. His advisor was Gerald Sacks. Friedman received the Alan T. Waterman Award in 1984. He also assumed the title of Visiting Scientist at IBM. He delivered the Tarski Lectures in 2007.

In 1967, Friedman was listed in the Guinness Book of World Records for being the world's youngest professor when he taught at Stanford University at age 18 as an assistant professor of philosophy. He has also been a professor of mathematics and a professor of music. He officially retired in July 2012. In September 2013, he received an honorary doctorate from Ghent University.

== Career ==
Friedman invented and proved important theorems regarding the finite promise games and greedy clique sequences, and Friedman's grand conjecture bears his name. Friedman was an invited speaker at the 1974 International Congress of Mathematicians, with a talk titled "Some systems of second order arithmetic and their use", which established the field of reverse mathematics by establishing various equivalences between a number of classical theorems in analysis in the setting of a weak background axiomatic system. According to zbMATH Open, Friedman has published approximately 100 peer-reviewed research articles and conference papers during the course of his academic career to early 2025.

Jordana Cepelewicz (2017) profiled Friedman in Nautilus, describing him as "about to bring incompleteness and infinity out of quarantine.".

Friedman also made headlines in the Italian newspaper La Repubblica for his manuscript A Divine Consistency Proof for Mathematics, which was later published in the book Ontology of Divinity. In this paper, Friedman showed that mathematics, as formalized by the usual ZFC axioms, is consistent, if one makes the strong assumption that there is an ultrafilter with a certain property on the universe of all sets. Following the ideas in Gödel's ontological proof, such an ultrafilter is considered in Friedman's paper as a mathematical abstraction of the concept of God's existence. Similarly to Gödel's proof, the argument is purely mathematical, and the theological interpretation of the mathematical assumption is not essential for Friedman's work.

== See also ==
- Friedman translation
