= Mostovsky, Volgograd Oblast =

Mostovsky Мостовский
- Khutor
- Location within Volgograd Oblast Location within Russia
- Coordinates: 49°44′N 42°54′E
- Country: Russia
- Region: Volgograd Oblast
- District: Serafimovichsky District
- Time zone: UTC+4:00

Mostovsky (Russian: Мостовский) is a rural locality (a khutor) in Tryasinovskoye Rural Settlement, Serafimovichsky District, Volgograd Oblast, Russia. The population was 97 as of 2010. There are 4 streets.

== Geography ==
Mostovsky is located 12 km south of Serafimovich (the district's administrative centre) by road. 2-y Bobrovsky is the nearest rural locality.
