= Michael Makkai =

Canadian mathematician

Michael Makkai (Hungarian: Makkai Mihály; 24 June 1939 in Budapest, Hungary) is a Canadian mathematician of Hungarian origin, specializing in mathematical logic. He works in model theory, category theory, algebraic logic, type theory and the theory of topoi.

== Career ==
=== Academic biography ===
Makkai was awarded his PhD from the Eötvös Loránd University, Budapest, in 1966, having been supervised by Rózsa Péter and Andrzej Mostowski. He then worked at the Mathematical Institute of the Hungarian Academy of Sciences. Between 1974 and 2010, he was professor of mathematics at McGill University, retiring in 2010. He is also an external member of the Hungarian Academy of Sciences (1995).

=== Work ===
With Leo Harrington and Saharon Shelah he proved the Vaught conjecture for ω-stable theories.

With Robert Paré he further developed the theory of Accessible Categories.

Makkai has an Erdős number of 1, having published "Some Remarks on Set Theory, X" with Paul Erdős in 1966.

== Selected publications ==
- M. Makkai, G. E. Reyes: First Order Categorical Logic, Lecture Notes in Mathematics, 611, Springer, 1977, viii+301 pp. doi:10.1007/BFb0066201
- L. Harrington, M. Makkai, S. Shelah: A proof of Vaught's conjecture for ω-stable theories, Israel Journal of Mathematics, 49(1984), 259–280. doi:10.1007/BF02760651
- Michael Makkai, Robert Paré: Accessible categories: the foundations of categorical model theory. Contemporary Mathematics, 104. American Mathematical Society, Providence, RI, 1989. viii+176 pp. ISBN 0-8218-5111-X, doi:10.1090/conm/104
- M. Makkai: Duality and Definability in First Order Logic, Memoirs of the American Mathematical Society, 503, 1993, ISSN 0065-9266. doi:10.1090/memo/0503
