= Ehrenfeucht–Mostowski theorem =

In model theory, a field within mathematical logic, the Ehrenfeucht–Mostowski theorem (Ehrenfeucht & Mostowski 1956) gives conditions for the existence of a model with indiscernibles.

== Statement ==
A linearly ordered set X is called a set of indiscernibles of a model if the truth of a statement about elements of X depends only on their order.

The Ehrenfeucht–Mostowski theorem states that if T is a theory with an infinite model, then there is a model of T containing any given linearly ordered set X as a set of indiscernibles.

The proof uses Ramsey's theorem.

== Applications ==
The Ehrenfeucht–Mostowski is used to construct models with many automorphisms. It is also used in the theory of zero sharp to construct indiscernibles in the constructible universe.
