= Cardinal function =

Function that returns cardinal numbers

In mathematics, a cardinal function (or cardinal invariant) is a function that returns cardinal numbers.

== Cardinal functions in set theory ==
- The most frequently used cardinal function is the function that assigns to a set A its cardinality, denoted by |A|.
- Aleph numbers and beth numbers can both be seen as cardinal functions defined on ordinal numbers.
- Cardinal arithmetic operations are examples of functions from cardinal numbers (or pairs of them) to cardinal numbers.
- Cardinal characteristics of a (proper) ideal I of subsets of X are:

${\rm add}(I) = \min\{|\mathcal{A}| : \mathcal{A}\subseteq I \wedge \bigcup \mathcal{A} \notin I\}.$

The "additivity" of I is the smallest number of sets from I whose union is not in I any more. As any ideal is closed under finite unions, this number is always at least $\aleph_0$; if I is a σ-ideal, then $\operatorname{add}(I) \ge \aleph_1.$

$\operatorname{cov}(I) = \min\{|\mathcal{A}| : \mathcal{A} \subseteq I \wedge \bigcup \mathcal{A} = X\}.$

The "covering number" of I is the smallest number of sets from I whose union is all of X. As X itself is not in I, we must have add(I ) ≤ cov(I ).

$\operatorname{non}(I) = \min\{|A| : A \subseteq X\ \wedge\ A \notin I\},$

The "uniformity number" of I (sometimes also written ${\rm unif}(I)$) is the size of the smallest set not in I. Assuming I contains all singletons, add(I ) ≤ non(I ).

${\rm cof}(I) = \min\{|\mathcal{B}| : \mathcal{B} \subseteq I \wedge \forall A \in I(\exists B \in \mathcal{B})(A\subseteq B)\}.$

The "cofinality" of I is the cofinality of the partial order (I, ⊆). It is easy to see that we must have non(I ) ≤ cof(I ) and cov(I ) ≤ cof(I ).

In the case that $I$ is an ideal closely related to the structure of the reals, such as the ideal of Lebesgue null sets or the ideal of meagre sets, these cardinal invariants are referred to as cardinal characteristics of the continuum.

- For a preordered set $(\mathbb{P},\sqsubseteq)$ the bounding number ${\mathfrak b}(\mathbb{P})$ and dominating number ${\mathfrak d}(\mathbb{P})$ are defined as

$${\mathfrak b}(\mathbb{P}) = \min\big\{|Y| : Y \subseteq \mathbb{P}\ \wedge\ (\forall x\in \mathbb{P})(\exists y\in Y)(y\not\sqsubseteq x)\big\},$$
${\mathfrak d}(\mathbb{P}) = \min\big\{|Y| : Y \subseteq \mathbb{P}\ \wedge\ (\forall x\in \mathbb{P})(\exists y\in Y)(x\sqsubseteq y)\big\}.$

- In PCF theory the cardinal function $pp_\kappa(\lambda)$ is used.

== Cardinal functions in topology ==
Cardinal functions are widely used in topology as a tool for describing various topological properties. Below are some examples. (Note: some authors, arguing that "there are no finite cardinal numbers in general topology", prefer to define the cardinal functions listed below so that they never taken on finite cardinal numbers as values; this requires modifying some of the definitions given below, for example by adding "$\;\; + \;\aleph_0$" to the right-hand side of the definitions, etc.)

- Perhaps the simplest cardinal invariants of a topological space $X$ are its cardinality and the cardinality of its topology, denoted respectively by $|X|$ and $o(X).$
- The weight $\operatorname{w}(X)$ of a topological space $X$ is the cardinality of the smallest base for $X.$ When $\operatorname{w}(X) = \aleph_0$ the space $X$ is said to be second countable.
  - The $\pi$-weight of a space $X$ is the cardinality of the smallest $\pi$-base for $X.$ (A $\pi$-base is a set of non-empty open sets whose supersets includes all opens.)
  - The network weight $\operatorname{nw}(X)$ of $X$ is the smallest cardinality of a network for $X.$ A network is a family $\mathcal{N}$ of sets, for which, for all points $x$ and open neighbourhoods $U$ containing $x,$ there exists $B$ in $\mathcal{N}$ for which $x \in B \subseteq U.$
- The character of a topological space $X$ at a point $x$ is the cardinality of the smallest local base for $x.$ The character of space $X$ is
  $$\chi(X) = \sup \; \{\chi(x,X) : x\in X\}.$$
  When $\chi(X) = \aleph_0$ the space $X$ is said to be first countable.
- The density $\operatorname{d}(X)$ of a space $X$ is the cardinality of the smallest dense subset of $X.$ When $\rm{d}(X) = \aleph_0$ the space $X$ is said to be separable.
- The Lindelöf number $\operatorname{L}(X)$ of a space $X$ is the smallest infinite cardinality such that every open cover has a subcover of cardinality no more than $\operatorname{L}(X).$ When $\rm{L}(X) = \aleph_0$ the space $X$ is said to be a Lindelöf space.
- The cellularity or Suslin number of a space $X$ is

$$\operatorname{c}(X) = \sup\{|\mathcal{U}| : \mathcal{U} \text{ is a family of mutually disjoint non-empty open subsets of } X\}.$$

- The hereditary cellularity (sometimes called spread) is the least upper bound of cellularities of its subsets:
  $$s(X) = {\rm hc}(X) = \sup\{ {\rm c} (Y) : Y \subseteq X \}$$
  or
  $$s(X) = \sup\{|Y|:Y \subseteq X \text{ with the subspace topology is discrete} \}$$
  where "discrete" means that it is a discrete topological space.

- The extent of a space $X$ is
  $$e(X) = \sup\{|Y| : Y \subseteq X \text{ is closed and discrete}\}.$$
  So $X$ has countable extent exactly when it has no uncountable closed discrete subset.
- The tightness $t(x, X)$ of a topological space $X$ at a point $x \in X$ is the smallest cardinal number $\alpha$ such that, whenever $x\in{\rm cl}_X(Y)$ for some subset $Y$ of $X,$ there exists a subset $Z$ of $Y$ with $|Z| \leq \alpha,$ such that $x\in \operatorname{cl}_X(Z).$ Symbolically,
  $$t(x, X) = \sup \left\{ \min \{|Z| : Z\subseteq Y\ \wedge\ x\in {\rm cl}_X(Z)\} : Y \subseteq X\ \wedge\ x \in {\rm cl}_X(Y)\right\}.$$
  The tightness of a space $X$ is
  $$t(X) = \sup\{t(x, X) : x \in X\}.$$
  When $t(X) = \aleph_0$ the space $X$ is said to be countably generated or countably tight.
  - The augmented tightness of a space $X,$ $t^+(X)$ is the smallest regular cardinal $\alpha$ such that for any $Y \subseteq X,$ $x\in{\rm cl}_X(Y)$ there is a subset $Z$ of $Y$ with cardinality less than $\alpha,$ such that $x\in{\rm cl}_X(Z).$

=== Basic inequalities ===
$$c(X) \leq d(X) \leq w(X) \leq o(X) \leq 2^{|X|}$$
$$e(X) \leq s(X)$$
$$\chi(X) \leq w(X)$$
$$\operatorname{nw}(X) \leq w(X) \text{ and } o(X) \leq 2^{\operatorname{nw}(X)}$$

== Cardinal functions in Boolean algebras ==
Cardinal functions are often used in the study of Boolean algebras. We can mention, for example, the following functions:

- Cellularity $c(\mathbb{B})$ of a Boolean algebra $\mathbb{B}$ is the supremum of the cardinalities of antichains in $\mathbb{B}$.
- Length ${\rm length}(\mathbb{B})$ of a Boolean algebra $\mathbb{B}$ is

$${\rm length}(\mathbb{B}) = \sup\big\{|A| : A \subseteq \mathbb{B} \text{ is a chain} \big\}$$

- Depth ${\rm depth}(\mathbb{B})$ of a Boolean algebra $\mathbb{B}$ is

$${\rm depth}(\mathbb{B}) = \sup\big\{|A| : A \subseteq \mathbb{B} \text{ is a well-ordered subset} \big\}$$.

- Incomparability ${\rm Inc}(\mathbb{B})$ of a Boolean algebra $\mathbb{B}$ is

$${\rm Inc}({\mathbb B}) = \sup\big\{|A| : A \subseteq \mathbb{B} \text{ such that } \forall a,b \in A \big(a \neq b\ \Rightarrow \neg (a\leq b\ \vee \ b \leq a)\big)\big\}$$.

- Pseudo-weight $\pi(\mathbb{B})$ of a Boolean algebra $\mathbb{B}$ is

$$\pi(\mathbb{B}) = \min\big\{|A| : A \subseteq \mathbb{B}\setminus \{0\} \text{ such that } \forall b \in B\setminus\{0\} \big(\exists a \in A\big)\big(a \leq b\big)\big\}.$$

== Cardinal functions in algebra ==
Examples of cardinal functions in algebra are:

- Index of a subgroup H of G is the number of cosets.
- Dimension of a vector space V over a field K is the cardinality of any Hamel basis of V.
- More generally, for a free module M over a ring R we define rank ${\rm rank}(M)$ as the cardinality of any basis of this module.
- For a linear subspace W of a vector space V we define codimension of W (with respect to V).
- For any algebraic structure it is possible to consider the minimal cardinality of generators of the structure.
- For algebraic field extensions, algebraic degree and separable degree are often employed (the algebraic degree equals the dimension of the extension as a vector space over the smaller field).
- For non-algebraic field extensions, transcendence degree is likewise used.

== See also ==
- Cichoń's diagram
