= Countable chain condition =

Condition in order theory and topology

In order theory, a partially ordered set X is said to satisfy the countable chain condition, or to be ccc, if every strong antichain in X is countable.

== Overview ==
There are really two conditions: the upwards and downwards countable chain conditions. These are not equivalent. The countable chain condition means the downwards countable chain condition, in other words no two elements have a common lower bound.

This is called the "countable chain condition" rather than the more logical term "countable antichain condition" for historical reasons related to certain chains of open sets in topological spaces and chains in complete Boolean algebras, where chain conditions sometimes happen to be equivalent to antichain conditions. For example, if κ is a cardinal, then in a complete Boolean algebra every antichain has size less than κ if and only if there is no descending κ-sequence of elements, so chain conditions are equivalent to antichain conditions.

Partial orders and spaces satisfying the ccc are used in the statement of Martin's axiom.

In the theory of forcing, ccc partial orders are used because forcing with any generic set over such an order preserves cardinals and cofinalities. Furthermore, the ccc property is preserved by finite support iterations (see iterated forcing). For more information on ccc in the context of forcing, see Forcing (set theory) § The countable chain condition.

More generally, if κ is a cardinal then a poset is said to satisfy the κ-chain condition, also written as κ-c.c., if every strong antichain has size less than κ. The countable chain condition is the ℵ_{1}-chain condition.

== Examples and properties in topology ==
A topological space is said to satisfy the countable chain condition, or Suslin's Condition, if the partially ordered set of non-empty open subsets of X satisfies the countable chain condition, i.e. every pairwise disjoint collection of non-empty open subsets of X is countable. The name originates from Suslin's Problem.

- Every separable topological space has the ccc. Furthermore, a product space of an arbitrary number of separable spaces has the ccc.
- A metric space has the ccc if and only if it's separable.
- In general, a topological space with ccc need not be separable. For example, a Cantor cube $\{ 0, 1 \}^\kappa$ with the product topology has the ccc for any cardinal $\kappa$, though not separable for $\kappa > \mathfrak{c}$.
- Paracompact ccc spaces are Lindelöf.
- An example of a topological space with the ccc is the real line.
