= Gimel function =

Theorem in axiomatic set theory

In axiomatic set theory, the gimel function is the following function mapping cardinal numbers to cardinal numbers:

$$\gimel\colon\kappa\mapsto\kappa^{\mathrm{cf}(\kappa)}$$

where cf denotes the cofinality function; the gimel function is used for studying the continuum function and the cardinal exponentiation function. The symbol $\gimel$ is a serif form of the Hebrew letter gimel.

== Values of the gimel function ==
The gimel function has the property $\gimel(\kappa)>\kappa$ for all infinite cardinals $\kappa$ by König's theorem.

For regular cardinals $\kappa$, $\gimel(\kappa)= 2^\kappa$, and Easton's theorem says that very little about this function can be determined in ZFC without additional axioms. For singular $\kappa$, upper bounds for $\gimel(\kappa)$ can be found from Shelah's PCF theory.

== The gimel hypothesis ==
The gimel hypothesis states that $\gimel(\kappa)=\max(2^{\text{cf}(\kappa)},\kappa^+)$. In essence, this means that $\gimel(\kappa)$ for singular $\kappa$ is the smallest value allowed by the axioms of Zermelo–Fraenkel set theory (assuming consistency).

Under this hypothesis cardinal exponentiation is simplified, though not to the extent of the generalized continuum hypothesis (which implies the gimel hypothesis).

== Reducing the exponentiation function to the gimel function ==
Bukovský (1965) showed that all cardinal exponentiation is determined (recursively) by the gimel function as follows.

- If $\kappa$ is an infinite regular cardinal (in particular any infinite successor) then $2^\kappa = \gimel(\kappa)$
- If $\kappa$ is infinite and singular and the continuum function is eventually constant below $\kappa$ then $2^\kappa=2^{<\kappa}$
- If $\kappa$ is a limit and the continuum function is not eventually constant below $\kappa$ then $2^\kappa=\gimel(2^{<\kappa})$

The remaining rules hold whenever $\kappa$ and $\lambda$ are both infinite:

- If ℵ_{0} ≤ κ ≤ λ then κ^{λ} = 2^{λ}
- If μ^{λ} ≥ κ for some μ < κ then κ^{λ} = μ^{λ}
- If κ > λ and μ^{λ} < κ for all μ < κ and cf(κ) ≤ λ then κ^{λ} = κ^{cf(κ)}
- If κ > λ and μ^{λ} < κ for all μ < κ and cf(κ) > λ then κ^{λ} = κ

== See also ==
- Aleph number
- Beth number
