= Continuum (set theory) =

The real numbers or their cardinality

In the mathematical field of set theory, the continuum means the real numbers, or the corresponding (infinite) cardinal number, denoted by $\mathfrak{c}$. Georg Cantor proved that the cardinality $\mathfrak{c}$ is larger than the smallest infinity, namely, $\aleph_0$. He also proved that $\mathfrak{c}$ is equal to $2^{\aleph_0}\!$, the cardinality of the power set of the natural numbers.

The cardinality of the continuum is the size of the set of real numbers. The continuum hypothesis is sometimes stated by saying that no cardinality lies between that of the continuum and that of the natural numbers, $\aleph_0$, or alternatively, that $\mathfrak{c} = \aleph_1$.

Simon Stevin has been credited with initiating the concept of a continuum.

== Linear continuum ==
Four axioms make a set C and the relation < into a linear continuum:

- C is simply ordered with respect to <.
- If [A,B] is a cut of C, then either A has a last element or B has a first element. (compare Dedekind cut)
- There exists a non-empty, countable subset S of C such that, if x,y ∈ C such that x < y, then there exists z ∈ S such that x < z < y. (separability axiom)
- C has no first element and no last element. (Unboundedness axiom)

These axioms characterize the order type of the real number line.

== See also ==
- Aleph null
- Suslin's problem
- Transfinite number
