= Cardinal and Ordinal Numbers =

1958 book by Wacław Sierpiński

- Author: Wacław Sierpiński
- Language: English
- Series: Monografie Matematyczne
- Subject: the mathematics of transfinite numbers
- Publisher: Państwowe Wydawnictwo Naukowe
- Publication date: 1958; 2nd ed., 1965
- Publication place: Poland
- Pages: 487 (1st ed.); 491 (2nd ed.)

Cardinal and Ordinal Numbers is a book on transfinite numbers, by Polish mathematician Wacław Sierpiński. It was published in 1958 by Państwowe Wydawnictwo Naukowe, as volume 34 of the series Monografie Matematyczne of the Institute of Mathematics of the Polish Academy of Sciences. Sierpiński wrote on the same topic earlier, in his 1928 book Leçons sur les nombres transfinis, but his 1958 book on the topic was completely rewritten and significantly longer; a second slightly revised edition was published in 1965.

== Topics ==
After five introductory chapters on naive set theory and set-theoretic notation, and a sixth chapter on the axiom of choice, the book has four chapters on cardinal numbers, their arithmetic, and series and products of cardinal numbers, comprising approximately 50 pages. Following this, four longer chapters (totalling roughly 180 pages) cover orderings of sets, order types, well-orders, ordinal numbers, ordinal arithmetic, and the Burali-Forti paradox according to which the collection of all ordinal numbers cannot be a set. Three final chapters concern aleph numbers and the continuum hypothesis, statements equivalent to the axiom of choice, and consequences of the axiom of choice.

The second edition makes only minor changes to the first except for adding footnotes concerning two later developments in the area: the proof by Paul Cohen of the independence of the continuum hypothesis, and the construction by Robert M. Solovay of the Solovay model in which all sets of real numbers are Lebesgue measurable.

== Audience and reception ==
Sierpiński was known for his significant contributions to the theory of transfinite numbers;, reviewer Reuben Goodstein calls his book "a goldmine of results", and similarly Leonard Gillman writes that it is highly valuable "as a compendium of interesting mathematical information, presented with care and clarity". Both Gillman and John C. Oxtoby call the writing style "leisurely" and "unhurried", and although Gillman criticizes the translation from an earlier Polish-language manuscript into English as unpolished, and points to several errors in the bibliography, he does not find the writing in the text of the book to be problematic.

In the 1970 text General Topology by Stephen Willard, Willard lists this book as one of five "standard references" on set theory.
