= Pcf theory =

Pcf theory is the name of a mathematical theory, introduced by Saharon Shelah (1978), that deals with the cofinality of the ultraproducts of ordered sets. It gives strong upper bounds on the cardinalities of power sets of singular cardinals, among other applications. The abbreviation "pcf" stands for "possible cofinalities".

== Main definitions ==
If A is an infinite set of regular cardinals, D is an ultrafilter on A, then we let $\operatorname{cf}\left(\prod A/D\right)$ denote the cofinality of the ordered set of functions $\prod A$ where the ordering is defined as follows: $f<g$ if $\{x\in A:f(x)<g(x)\}\in D$. pcf(A) is the set of cofinalities that occur if we consider all ultrafilters on A, that is,

$\operatorname{pcf}(A)=\left\{\operatorname{cf}\left(\prod A/D\right):D\,\,\mbox{is an ultrafilter on}\,\,A\right\}.$

== Main results ==
Obviously, pcf(A) consists of regular cardinals. Considering ultrafilters concentrated on elements of A, we get that $A\subseteq \operatorname{pcf}(A)$. Shelah proved, that if $|A|<\min(A)$, then pcf(A) has a largest element, and there are subsets $\{B_\theta:\theta\in \operatorname{pcf}(A)\}$ of A such that for each ultrafilter D on A, $\operatorname{cf}\left(\prod A/D\right)$ is the least element θ of pcf(A) such that $B_\theta\in D$. Consequently, $\left|\operatorname{pcf}(A)\right|\leq2^{|A|}$. Shelah also proved that if A is an interval of regular cardinals (i.e., A is the set of all regular cardinals between two cardinals), then pcf(A) is also an interval of regular cardinals and |pcf(A)|<|A|^{+4}. This implies the famous inequality

$2^{\aleph_\omega}<\aleph_{\omega_4}$

assuming that ℵ_{ω} is strong limit.

If λ is an infinite cardinal, then J_{<λ} is the following ideal on A. B∈J_{<λ} if $\operatorname{cf}\left(\prod A/D\right)<\lambda$ holds for every ultrafilter D with B∈D. Then J_{<λ} is the ideal generated by the sets $\{B_\theta:\theta\in \operatorname{pcf}(A),\theta<\lambda\}$. There exist scales, i.e., for every λ∈pcf(A) there is a sequence of length λ of elements of $\prod B_\lambda$ which is both increasing and cofinal mod J_{<λ}. This implies that the cofinality of $\prod A$ under pointwise dominance is max(pcf(A)). Another consequence is that if λ is singular and no regular cardinal less than λ is Jónsson, then also λ^{+} is not Jónsson. In particular, there is a Jónsson algebra on ℵ_{ω+1}, which settles an old conjecture.

== Unsolved problems ==
The most notorious conjecture in pcf theory states that |pcf(A)|=|A| holds for every set A of regular cardinals with |A|<min(A). This would imply that if ℵ_{ω} is strong limit, then the sharp bound

$2^{\aleph_\omega}<\aleph_{\omega_1}$

holds. The analogous bound

$2^{\aleph_{\omega_1}}<\aleph_{\omega_2}$

follows from Chang's conjecture (Magidor) or even from the nonexistence of a Kurepa tree (Shelah).

A weaker, still unsolved conjecture states that if |A|<min(A), then pcf(A) has no inaccessible limit point. This is equivalent to the statement that pcf(pcf(A))=pcf(A).

== Applications ==
The theory has found a great deal of applications, besides cardinal arithmetic. The original survey by Shelah, Cardinal arithmetic for skeptics, includes the following topics: almost free abelian groups, partition problems, failure of preservation of chain conditions in Boolean algebras under products, existence of Jónsson algebras, existence of entangled linear orders, equivalently narrow Boolean algebras, and the existence of nonisomorphic models equivalent in certain infinitary logics.

In the meantime, many further applications have been found in Set Theory, Model Theory, Algebra and Topology.
