= Continuum function =

In mathematics, the continuum function is the function $\kappa\mapsto 2^\kappa$ on cardinals, i.e. raising 2 to the power of κ using cardinal exponentiation. Given a cardinal number, the cardinal function yields the cardinality of the power set of a set of the given cardinality.

== See also ==
- Continuum hypothesis
- Cardinality of the continuum
- Beth number
- Easton's theorem
- Gimel function
