= William Bigelow Easton =

American mathematician

William Bigelow Easton is an American mathematician and computer scientist who proved Easton's theorem about the possible values of the continuum function. His advisor at Princeton was the mathematician and computer scientist Alonzo Church. As of 2026, he lives in Charlottesville, Virginia.

== Publications ==
- Easton, W. (1970), "Powers of regular cardinals", Ann. Math. Logic, 1 (2): 139–178, doi:10.1016/0003-4843(70)90012-4
- Easton, William B. (1972). "Process Synchronization without Long-Term Interlock". In McCluskey, Edward J.; Fortis, Nicholas A.; Lampson, Butler W.; Bredt, Thomas H. (eds.). Proceedings of the Third Symposium on Operating System Principles, SOSP 1971, Stanford University, Palo Alto, California, USA, October 18-20, 1971. ACM. pp. 95–100.
