= Easton's theorem =

Mathematical theorem in set theory

In set theory, Easton's theorem is a result on the possible cardinal numbers of powersets. Easton (1970) (extending a result of Robert M. Solovay) showed via forcing that the only constraints on permissible values for 2^{κ} when κ is a regular cardinal are

$$\kappa < \operatorname{cf}(2^\kappa)$$

(where cf(α) is the cofinality of α) and

$$\text{if } \kappa < \lambda \text{ then } 2^\kappa\le 2^\lambda.$$

== Statement ==
If $G$ is a class function whose domain consists of ordinals and whose range consists of ordinals such that

1. $G$ is non-decreasing,
2. the cofinality of $\aleph_{G(\alpha)}$ is greater than $\aleph_\alpha$ for each $\alpha$ in the domain of $G$, and
3. $\aleph_\alpha$ is regular for each $\alpha$ in the domain of $G$,

then (assuming ZFC is consistent) there is a model of ZFC such that

$$2^{\aleph_\alpha} = \aleph_{G(\alpha)}$$

for each $\alpha$ in the domain of $G$.

The proof of Easton's theorem uses forcing with a proper class of forcing conditions over a model satisfying the generalized continuum hypothesis.

The first two conditions in the theorem are necessary. Condition 1 is a well known property of cardinality, while condition 2 follows from Kőnig's theorem.

In Easton's model the powersets of singular cardinals have the smallest possible cardinality compatible with the conditions that $2^{\kappa}$ has cofinality greater than $\kappa$ and is a non-decreasing function of $\kappa$.

== No extension to singular cardinals ==
Silver (1975) proved that a singular cardinal of uncountable cofinality cannot be the smallest cardinal for which the generalized continuum hypothesis fails. This shows that Easton's theorem cannot be extended to the class of all cardinals. The program of PCF theory gives results on the possible values of $2^\lambda$ for singular cardinals $\lambda$. PCF theory shows that the values of the continuum function on singular cardinals are strongly influenced by the values on smaller cardinals, whereas Easton's theorem shows that the values of the continuum function on regular cardinals are only weakly influenced by the values on smaller cardinals.

== See also ==
- Singular cardinal hypothesis
- Aleph number
- Beth number
