= Ilocano numbers =

Numeral system used by the Ilocano

Ilocano has two number systems: one is native and the other is derived from Spanish. The systems are virtually used interchangeably. Yet, the situation can dictate which system is preferred.

Typically, Ilocanos use native numbers for one through 10, and Spanish numbers for amounts of 10 and higher.

Specific time is told using the Spanish system and numbers for hours and minutes, for example, Alas dos/A las dos (2 o'clock).

For dates, cardinal Spanish numbers are the norm; for example, 12 (dose) ti Julio/Hulio (the twelfth of July).

As with other roots in the language, numbers can undergo various forms of agglutination.

== Cardinal ==
Cardinal numbers are those used in counting.

Number	Ilocano-Native	Ilocano-Spanish	Spanish / Spanish-style spelling
1	maysa	uno	uno
2	dua	dos	dos
3	tallo	tres	tres
4	uppat	kuatro	cuatro
5	lima	singko	cinco
6	innem	sais	seis
7	pito	siete	siete
8	walo	otso	ocho
9	siam	nuebe	nueve
10	sangapulo, pullo	dies	diez
11	sangapulo ket maysa	onse	once
12	sangapulo ket dua	dose	doce
13	sangapulo ket tallo	trese	trece
14	sangapulo ket uppat	katorse	catorce
15	sangapulo ket lima	kinse	quince
16	sangapulo ket innem	diesisais	diez y seis, dieciséis
17	sangapulo ket pito	diesisiete	diez y siete, diecisiete
18	sangapulo ket walo	diesiotso	diez y ocho, dieciocho
19	sangapulo ket siam	diesinuebe	diez y nueve, diecinueve
20	duapulo	beinte	veinte
21	duapulo ket maysa	beintiuno	veinte y uno, veintiúno
30	tallopulo	treinta	treinta
31	tallopulo ket maysa	treinta y uno	treinta y uno
40	uppat a pulo	kuarenta	cuarenta
50	limapulo	singkuenta	cincuenta
60	innem a pulo	sesenta	sesenta
70	pitopulo	setenta	setenta
80	walopulo	otsenta	ochenta
90	siam a pulo	nobenta	noventa
100	sangagasut, gasut	sien, siento	cien, ciento
101	sangagasut ket maysa	siento y uno	ciento y uno
200	duagasut	dosientos	doscientos
300	tallogasut	tresientos	trescientos
400	uppat a gasut	kuatrosientos	cuatrocientos
500	limagasut	kinientos	quinientos
600	innem a gasut	saisientos	seiscientos
700	pitogasut	setesientos	setecientos
800	walogasut	otsosientos	ochocientos
900	siam a gasut	nobesientos	novecientos
1,000	sangaribo, ribo	mil	mil
2,000	duaribo	dos mil	dos mil
5,000	limaribo	singko mil	cinco mil
10,000	sangalaksa, sangapulo nga ribo	dies mil	diez mil
100,000	sangagasut a ribo	sien mil	cien mil
1,000,000	sangariwriw	milion	millón

Numbers are connected to their nouns using the ligature a/nga.

maysa a botelia one bottle
innem a riwriw a tao six million people

== Ordinal ==
To form the ordinal number (second, third, etc.), except for first, maika- is prefixed to the cardinal form. Note the exceptional forms for third, fourth and sixth. In some cases, Ilocano speakers tend to use Spanish ordinal numbers, especial in first, second, and third (primero/a, segundo/a, tersero/a).

Cardinal	Ordinal	Gloss
maysa	umuna (past: immuna)	first
dua	maikadua	second
tallo	maikatlo	third
uppat	maikapat	fourth
lima	maikalima	fifth
innem	maikanem	sixth
pito	maikapito	seventh
walo	maikawalo	eighth
siam	maikasiam	ninth
sangapulo	maikasangapulo	tenth

== Aggregate ==
With the group numbers (pulo, gasut, ribo, laksa and riwriw), infixing in indicates division.

Unit	Gloss	Aggregate	Gloss
pulo	ten	pinullo	by the tens, by the decade
gasut	hundred	ginasut	by the hundreds
ribo	thousand	rinibo	by the thousands
laksa	ten thousand	linaksa	by the ten-thousands, by the myriad
riwriw	million	riniwriw	by the millions

Aggregate numbers have already been introduced: sangapulo, sangaribo, etc. Each is prefixed with sanga-. To form other groups, other numbers, and units of length, time or capacity can be used with sanga-. The alternate form is sangka-.

Unit	Gloss	Aggregate	Gloss
pulo	ten	sangapulo	ten
lima	five	sangalima	a group of five
igup	swallow	sangaigup	a gulp
iwa	slice	sangaiwa	a slice of
lamut	in mouth	sangalamut	mouthful

== Distributive ==
Distributives are formed by prefixing sag- plus reduplication of the first CV (light reduplication) of the cardinal form or the unit. Distributives express so many each, so many a piece. Note the irregular forms for one each, three each, four each and six each.

Cardinal	Distributive	Gloss
maysa	saggaysa	one each, a piece
dua	sagdudua	two each, a piece
tallo	saggatlo	three each, a piece
uppat	sagpapat	four each, a piece
lima	saglilima	five each, a piece
innem	sagninem	six each, a piece
pito	sagpipito	seven each, a piece
walo	sagwawalo	eight each, a piece
mano	sagmamano	how many/much each, a piece
doliar	sagdodoliar	a dollar each, a piece

Saggatlokami. We take three each.
Sagdodoliarda. They are one dollar each.

When used with pami(n)-, sagpami(n)-, the result is a distributive multiplicative: so many times each.

Sagpaminduakami a napan a nabuya diay sine. We each saw the movie twice.

== Indefinite ==
Indefinite numbers are formed by prefixing sumag- and CV reduplication of the first syllable of the cardinal form. In addition, to the cardinal numbers, sumag- can be used with the interrogative mano How much/many?.

Cardinal	Indefinite	Gloss
dua	sumagdudua	about two
tallo	sumaggatlo	about three
uppat	sumagpapat	about four
mano	sumagmamano	about how much/many

== Limitative ==
Limitatives express no more, no less than what the root number or aggregate specifies. It is formed by reduplicating the CVC (heavy reduplication) of the first syllable of the cardinal number or root form. sanga-/sangka- may be reduplicated, sangsanga-/sangsangka-, also to express limitation.

Cardinal	Limitative	Gloss
maysa	maymaysa	only one
dua	dudua	only two
tallo	taltallo	only three
uppat	up-uppat	only four
sangaigup	sangsangaigup	only one gulp

Sangsangaigup ti nainumko I drank one gulp.

== Multiplicative ==
These adverbial numbers are formed by prefixing mami(n)- to the cardinal form. Note the forms for once, twice, three times/thrice. Perfect form: nami(n)-. There are cases when the word beses (from Sp. veces) replaces mami(n)- and nami(n)- prefixes (maysa beses, dua (nga) beses, etc.)

Cardinal	Multiplicative	Gloss
maysa	maminsan	once
dua	mamindua	two times, twice
tallo	mamitlo	three times, thrice
uppat	mamimpat	four times
lima	maminlima	five times
adu	mamin-adu	often, many times

Maminduakanto a mapan. You will go twice.
Mamimpitok a nabuya. I've watched it seven times.

The multiplicatives can be limited by maminpi-/mamipin- (Perf: naminpi-/namipin-).

Cardinal	Limited Multiplicative	Gloss
maysa	maminpinsan	only once
dua	maminpindua	only two times, twice
tallo	maminpitlo	only three times, thrice
uppat	maminpimpat	only four times
lima	maminpinlima	only five times

The multiplicatives can be made ordinal with kapami(n)-. The resulting form is treated as a nominal and takes ergative agents.

Cardinal	Limited Multiplicative	Gloss
maysa	kapaminsan	only time
dua	kapamindua	second time
tallo	kapamitlo	third time
uppat	kapamimpat	fourth time
lima	kapaminlima	fifth time

Kapaminlimana ti agbuya iti dayta a pelikula.
This is her fifth time to see that film.

Nakapamin- prefixed to numbers behaves as an adverb.

Nakapaminduana nga agpadawat iti kuarta.
He solicited twice for money.

== Fractional ==
The denominator in fractions is prefixed by pagka-. Numbers such as sangapulo ten, sangagasut hundred, etc. drop the sanga- prefix before taking the prefix.

Cardinal	Denominator	Gloss
tallo	pagkatlo	third
innem	pagkanem	sixth
sangagasut	pagkagasut	hundredth

maysa a pagkatlo one third
lima a pagkagasut 5 percent

== Divisional ==
Divisional numbers are formed by prefixing agka- and denote into how many parts something is divided. The perfective is nagka-.

Agkawalonto ti "apple pie". The apple pie will be divided into eight (pieces).
Nagkawalo ti "apple pie". The apple pie was divided into eight (pieces).

== See also ==
- Ilocano language
- Languages of the Philippines
