= Weak continuum hypothesis =

Set theory

The term weak continuum hypothesis can be used to refer to the hypothesis that $2^{\aleph_0}<2^{\aleph_1}$, which is the negation of the second continuum hypothesis. It is equivalent to a weak form of ◊ on $\aleph_1$. F. Burton Jones proved that if it is true, then every separable normal Moore space is metrizable.

Weak continuum hypothesis may also refer to the assertion that every uncountable set of real numbers can be placed in bijective correspondence with the set of all reals. This second assertion was Cantor's original form of the Continuum Hypothesis (CH). Given the Axiom of Choice, it is equivalent to the usual form of CH, that $2^{\aleph_0}=\aleph_1$.
