= Second continuum hypothesis =

The second continuum hypothesis, also called Luzin's hypothesis or Luzin's second continuum hypothesis, is the hypothesis that $2^{\aleph_0}=2^{\aleph_1}$. It is the negation of a weakened form, $2^{\aleph_0}<2^{\aleph_1}$, of the continuum hypothesis (CH). It was discussed by Nikolai Luzin in 1935, although he did not claim to be the first to postulate it. (Note: He didn't know who was the first: "Nous ne chercherons pas à donner le nom de l'auteur qui a conçu le premier la sériuse possibilité d'une telle hypothèse du continu...") The statement $2^{\aleph_0}<2^{\aleph_1}$ may also be called Luzin's hypothesis.

The second continuum hypothesis is independent of Zermelo–Fraenkel set theory with the axiom of choice (ZFC): its truth is consistent with ZFC since it is true in Cohen's model of ZFC with the negation of the continuum hypothesis; its falsity is also consistent since it is contradicted by the continuum hypothesis, which follows from V=L. It is implied by Martin's axiom together with the negation of the CH.
