= Regular cardinal =

Type of cardinal number in mathematics

In set theory, a regular cardinal is a cardinal number that is equal to its own cofinality. More explicitly, this means that $\kappa$ is a regular cardinal if and only if every unbounded subset $C \subseteq \kappa$ has cardinality $\kappa$. Infinite well-ordered cardinals that are not regular are called singular cardinals. Finite cardinal numbers are typically not called regular or singular.

In the presence of the axiom of choice, any cardinal number can be well-ordered, and so the following are equivalent:

1. $\kappa$ is a regular cardinal.
2. If $\kappa = \textstyle\sum_{i \in I} \lambda_i$ and $\lambda_i < \kappa$ for all $i$, then $|I| \ge \kappa$.
3. If $S = \textstyle\bigcup_{i \in I} S_i$, and if $|I| < \kappa$ and $|S_i| < \kappa$ for all $i$, then $|S| < \kappa$. That is, every union of fewer than $\kappa$ sets smaller than $\kappa$ is smaller than $\kappa$.
4. The category $\operatorname{Set}_{<\kappa}$ of sets of cardinality less than $\kappa$ and all functions between them is closed under colimits of cardinality less than $\kappa$.
5. $\kappa$ is a regular ordinal (see below).

Crudely speaking, this means that a regular cardinal is one that cannot be broken down into a small number of smaller parts.

The situation is slightly more complicated in contexts where the axiom of choice might fail, as in that case not all cardinals are necessarily the cardinalities of well-ordered sets. In that case, the above equivalence holds for well-orderable cardinals only.

An infinite ordinal $\alpha$ is a regular ordinal if it is a limit ordinal that is not the limit of a set of smaller ordinals that as a set has order type less than $\alpha$. A regular ordinal is always an initial ordinal, though some initial ordinals are not regular, e.g., $\omega_\omega$ (see the example below).

== Examples ==
The ordinals less than $\omega$ are finite. A finite sequence of finite ordinals always has a finite maximum, so $\omega$ cannot be the limit of any sequence of type less than $\omega$ whose elements are ordinals less than $\omega$, and is therefore a regular ordinal. $\aleph_0$ (aleph-null) is a regular cardinal because its initial ordinal, $\omega$, is regular. It can also be seen directly to be regular, as the cardinal sum of a finite number of finite cardinal numbers is itself finite.

$\omega+1$ is the next ordinal number greater than $\omega$. It is singular, since it is not a limit ordinal. $\omega+\omega$ is the next limit ordinal after $\omega$. It can be written as the limit of the sequence $\omega$, $\omega+1$, $\omega+2$, $\omega+3$, and so on. This sequence has order type $\omega$, so $\omega+\omega$ is the limit of a sequence of type less than $\omega+\omega$ whose elements are ordinals less than $\omega+\omega$; therefore it is singular.

$\aleph_1$ is the next cardinal number greater than $\aleph_0$, so the cardinals less than $\aleph_1$ are countable (finite or denumerable). Assuming the axiom of choice, the union of a countable set of countable sets is itself countable. So $\aleph_1$ cannot be written as the sum of a countable set of countable cardinal numbers, and is regular.

$\aleph_\omega$ is the next cardinal number after the sequence $\aleph_0$, $\aleph_1$, $\aleph_2$, $\aleph_3$, and so on. Its initial ordinal $\omega_\omega$ is the limit of the sequence $\omega$, $\omega_1$, $\omega_2$, $\omega_3$, and so on, which has order type $\omega$, so $\omega_\omega$ is singular, and so is $\aleph_\omega$. Assuming the axiom of choice, $\aleph_\omega$ is the first infinite cardinal that is singular (the first infinite ordinal that is singular is $\omega+1$, and the first infinite limit ordinal that is singular is $\omega+\omega$). Proving the existence of singular cardinals requires the axiom of replacement, and in fact the inability to prove the existence of $\aleph_\omega$ in Zermelo set theory is what led Fraenkel to postulate this axiom.

Uncountable (weak) limit cardinals that are also regular are known as (weakly) inaccessible cardinals. They cannot be proved to exist within ZFC, though their existence is not known to be inconsistent with ZFC. Their existence is sometimes taken as an additional axiom. Inaccessible cardinals are necessarily fixed points of the aleph function, though not all fixed points are regular. For instance, the first fixed point is the limit of the $\omega$-sequence $\aleph_0, \aleph_{\omega}, \aleph_{\omega_{\omega}}, ...$ and is therefore singular.

== Properties ==
If the axiom of choice holds, then every successor cardinal is regular. Thus the regularity or singularity of most aleph numbers can be checked depending on whether the cardinal is a successor cardinal or a limit cardinal. Some cardinalities cannot be proven to be equal to any particular aleph, for instance the cardinality of the continuum, whose value in ZFC may be any uncountable cardinal of uncountable cofinality (see Easton's theorem). The continuum hypothesis postulates that the cardinality of the continuum is equal to $\aleph_1$, which is regular assuming choice.

Without the axiom of choice: there would be cardinal numbers that were not well-orderable. Moreover, the cardinal sum of an arbitrary collection could not be defined. Therefore, only the aleph numbers could meaningfully be called regular or singular cardinals.Furthermore, a successor aleph would need not be regular. For instance, the union of a countable set of countable sets would not necessarily be countable. It is consistent with ZF that $\omega_1$ be the limit of a countable sequence of countable ordinals as well as the set of real numbers be a countable union of countable sets. Furthermore, it is consistent with ZF when not including AC that every aleph bigger than $\aleph_0$ is singular (a result proved by Moti Gitik).

If $\kappa$ is a limit ordinal, $\kappa$ is regular if the set of $\alpha<\kappa$ that are critical points of $\Sigma_1$-elementary embeddings $j$ with $j(\alpha)=\kappa$ is club in $\kappa$.

For cardinals $\kappa<\theta$, say that an elementary embedding $j:M\to H(\theta)$ a small embedding if $M$ is transitive and $j(\textrm{crit}(j))=\kappa$. A cardinal $\kappa$ is uncountable and regular iff there is an $\alpha>\kappa$ such that for every $\theta>\alpha$, there is a small embedding $j:M\to H(\theta)$.^{Corollary 2.2}

== See also ==
- Inaccessible cardinal
