= Aleph number =

Infinite cardinal number

Aleph-nought, aleph-zero, or aleph-null, the smallest infinite cardinal number

In mathematics, particularly in set theory, the aleph numbers are a sequence of numbers used to represent the cardinality (or size) of infinite sets. (Note: Given the axiom of choice, every infinite set has a cardinality that is an aleph number. In contexts where the axiom of choice is not available, the aleph numbers still constitute the cardinalities of those infinite sets that can be well-ordered.) They were introduced by the mathematician Georg Cantor and are named after the symbol he used to denote them, the Hebrew letter aleph (ℵ). (Note: In older mathematics books, the letter aleph is often printed upside down by accident—for example, in Sierpiński (1958) the letter aleph appears both the right way up and upside down, partly because a monotype matrix for aleph was mistakenly constructed the wrong way up.)

The smallest cardinality of an infinite set is that of the natural numbers, denoted by $\aleph_0$ (read aleph-nought, aleph-zero, or aleph-null); the next larger cardinality of a well-ordered set is $\aleph_1,$ then $\aleph_2,$ then $\aleph_3,$ and so on. Continuing in this manner, it is possible to define an infinite cardinal number $\aleph_{\alpha}$ for every ordinal number $\alpha,$ as described below.

The concept and notation are due to Georg Cantor, who defined the notion of cardinality and realized that infinite sets can have different cardinalities.

The aleph numbers differ from the infinity ($\infty$) commonly found in algebra and calculus, in that the alephs measure the sizes of sets, while infinity is commonly defined either as an extreme limit of the real number line (applied to a function or sequence that "diverges to infinity" or "increases without bound"), or as an extreme point of the extended real number line.

== Aleph-zero ==
$\aleph_0$ (aleph-nought, aleph-zero, or aleph-null) is the cardinality of the set of all natural numbers, and is an infinite cardinal. The set of all finite ordinals, called $\omega$ or $\omega_0$ (where $\omega$ is the lowercase Greek letter omega), also has cardinality $\aleph_0$. A set has cardinality $\aleph_0$ if and only if it is countably infinite, that is, there is a bijection (one-to-one correspondence) between it and the natural numbers. Examples of such sets are:

- the set of natural numbers, irrespective of including or excluding zero,
- the set of all integers,
- any infinite subset of the integers, such as the set of all square numbers or the set of all prime numbers,
- the set of all rational numbers,
- the set of all constructible numbers (in the geometric sense),
- the set of all algebraic numbers,
- the set of all computable numbers,
- the set of all computable functions,
- the set of all binary strings of finite length, and
- the set of all finite subsets of any given countably infinite set.

Among the countably infinite sets are certain infinite ordinals, (Note: This is using the convention that an ordinal is identified with the set of all ordinals less than itself (the so-called von Neumann ordinals).) including for example $\omega$, $\omega+1$, $\omega \cdot 2$, $\omega^2$, $\omega^\omega$, and $\varepsilon_0$. For example, the sequence (with order type $\omega \cdot 2$) of all positive odd integers followed by all positive even integers $\{1, 3, 5, 7, 9, \cdots; 2, 4, 6, 8, 10, \cdots\}$ is a well-ordering of the set (with cardinality $\aleph_0$) of positive integers.

If the axiom of countable choice (a weaker version of the axiom of choice) holds, then $\aleph_0$ is smaller than any other infinite cardinal.

== Aleph-one ==
$\aleph_1$ is the cardinality of the set of all countable ordinal numbers. This set is denoted by $\omega_1$ (or sometimes Ω). The set $\omega_1$ is itself an ordinal number larger than all countable ones, so it is an uncountable set. Therefore, $\aleph_1$ is the smallest cardinality that is larger than $\aleph_0,$ the smallest infinite cardinality.

The definition of $\aleph_1$ implies (in ZF, Zermelo–Fraenkel set theory without the axiom of choice) that no cardinal number is between $\aleph_0$ and $\aleph_1.$ If the axiom of choice is used, it can be further proved that the class of cardinal numbers is totally ordered, and thus $\aleph_1$ is the second-smallest infinite cardinal number. One can show one of the most useful properties of the set $\omega_1$: Any countable subset of $\omega_1$ has an upper bound in $\omega_1$ (this follows from the fact that the union of a countable number of countable sets is itself countable). This fact is analogous to the situation in $\aleph_0$: Every finite set of natural numbers has a maximum, which is also a natural number, and finite unions of finite sets are finite.

An example application of the ordinal $\omega_1$ is "closing" with respect to countable-arity operations; e.g., trying to explicitly describe the σ-algebra generated by an arbitrary collection of subsets (see e.g. Borel hierarchy). This is harder than most explicit descriptions of "generation" in algebra (vector spaces, groups, etc.) because in those cases we only have to close with respect to finite operations—sums, products, etc. The process involves defining, for each countable ordinal, via transfinite induction, a set by "throwing in" all possible countable unions and complements, and taking the union of all that over all of $\omega_1.$

== Continuum hypothesis ==
The cardinality of the set of real numbers (cardinality of the continuum) is 2^{$\aleph_0$}. It cannot be determined from ZFC (Zermelo–Fraenkel set theory augmented with the axiom of choice) where this number fits exactly in the aleph number hierarchy, but it follows from ZFC that the continuum hypothesis (CH) is equivalent to the identity

$2^{\aleph_0} = \aleph_1$.

The CH states that there is no set whose cardinality is strictly between that of the natural numbers and the real numbers. CH is independent of ZFC: It can be neither proven nor disproven within the context of that axiom system (provided that ZFC is consistent). That CH is consistent with ZFC was demonstrated by Kurt Gödel in 1940, when he showed that its negation is not a theorem of ZFC. That it is independent of ZFC was demonstrated by Paul Cohen in 1963, when he showed conversely that the CH itself is not a theorem of ZFC, using the (then-novel) method of forcing.

== Aleph-omega ==
Aleph-omega is $\aleph_\omega = \aleph_n ^ {n \in \omega} = \aleph_n ^ {n \in \{0, 1, 2,\cdots\}}$ where the smallest infinite ordinal is denoted as $\omega$. That is, the cardinal number $\aleph_\omega$ is the least upper bound of $\aleph_n ^ {n \in \{0, 1, 2,\cdots\}}$.

Notably, $\aleph_\omega$ is the first uncountable cardinal number that can be demonstrated within Zermelo–Fraenkel set theory not to be equal to the cardinality of the set of all real numbers $2^{\aleph_0}$: For any natural number $n \ge 1$, we can consistently assume that $2^{\aleph_0} = \aleph_n$, and moreover it is possible to assume that $2^{\aleph_0}$ is at least as large as any cardinal number we like. The main restriction ZFC puts on the value of $2^{\aleph_0}$ is that it cannot equal certain special cardinals with cofinality $\aleph_0$. An uncountably infinite cardinal $\kappa$ having cofinality $\aleph_0$ means that there is a (countable-length) sequence $\kappa_0 \le \kappa_1 \le \kappa_2 \le \cdots$ of cardinals $\kappa_i < \kappa$ whose limit (i.e. its least upper bound) is $\kappa$ (see Easton's theorem). As per the definition above, $\aleph_\omega$ is the limit of a countable-length sequence of smaller cardinals.

== Aleph-α for general α ==
To define $\aleph_\alpha$ for arbitrary ordinal number $\alpha$, we must define the successor cardinal operation, which assigns to any cardinal number $\rho$ the next larger well-ordered cardinal $\rho^{+}$ (if the axiom of choice holds, this is the (unique) next larger cardinal).

We can then define the aleph numbers as follows:

$$\aleph_0 = \omega$$
$$\aleph_{\alpha+1} = (\aleph_{\alpha})^{+}$$
$\aleph_{\lambda} = \bigcup\{\aleph_\alpha | \alpha < \lambda\}$ for $\lambda$ an infinite limit ordinal,

The $\alpha$-th infinite initial ordinal is written $\omega_\alpha$. Its cardinality is written $\aleph_\alpha$.

Alternatively, for every infinite cardinal $\kappa$ that can be well ordered, an index can be defined as the ordinal of the well ordered set of all infinite cardinals that precede $\kappa$. Then it can be proved by transfinite induction that if $\alpha$ in the index of $\kappa$ then $\kappa=\aleph_\alpha$

Informally, the aleph function $\aleph : \text{On} \rightarrow \text{Cd}$ is a bijection from the ordinals to the infinite cardinals that can be well ordered. Formally, in ZFC, $\aleph$ is not a function, but a function-like class, as it is not a set (due to the Burali-Forti paradox).

== Fixed points of omega ==
For any ordinal $\alpha$ we have $\alpha \le \omega_\alpha$.

In many cases $\omega_\alpha$ is strictly greater than α. For example, it is true for any successor ordinal: $\alpha + 1 \le \omega_{\alpha} < \omega_{\alpha+1}$ holds. There are, however, some limit ordinals that are fixed points of the omega function, because of the fixed-point lemma for normal functions. The first such is the limit of the sequence

$$\omega, \omega_{\omega}, \omega_{\omega_{\omega}}, \cdots$$

which is sometimes denoted $\omega_{\omega_{\ddots}}$.

Any weakly inaccessible cardinal is also a fixed point of the aleph function. This can be shown in ZFC as follows. Suppose $\kappa = \aleph_{\lambda}$ is a weakly inaccessible cardinal. If $\lambda$ were a successor ordinal, then $\aleph_{\lambda}$ would be a successor cardinal and hence not weakly inaccessible. If $\lambda$ were a limit ordinal less than $\kappa$ then its cofinality (and thus the cofinality of $\aleph_\lambda$) would be less than $\kappa$ and so $\kappa$ would not be regular and thus not weakly inaccessible. Thus $\lambda \ge \kappa$ and consequently $\lambda = \kappa$, which makes it a fixed point.

== Role of axiom of choice ==
The cardinality of any infinite ordinal number is an aleph number. Every aleph is the cardinality of some ordinal. The least of these is its initial ordinal. Any set whose cardinality is an aleph is equinumerous with an ordinal and is thus well-orderable.

Each finite set is well-orderable, but does not have an aleph as its cardinality.

Over ZF, the assumption that the cardinality of each infinite set is an aleph number is equivalent to the existence of a well-ordering of every set, which in turn is equivalent to the axiom of choice. ZFC set theory, which includes the axiom of choice, implies that every infinite set has an aleph number as its cardinality (i.e. is equinumerous with its initial ordinal), and thus the initial ordinals of the aleph numbers serve as a class of representatives for all possible infinite cardinal numbers.

When cardinality is studied in ZF without the axiom of choice, it is no longer possible to prove that each infinite set has some aleph number as its cardinality; the sets whose cardinality is an aleph number are exactly the infinite sets that can be well-ordered. The method of Scott's trick is sometimes used as an alternative way to construct representatives for cardinal numbers in the setting of ZF. For example, one can define $\text{card}(S)$ to be the set of sets with the same cardinality as $S$ of minimum possible rank. This has the property that $\text{card}(S) = \text{card}(T)$ if and only if $S$ and $T$ have the same cardinality. (The set $\text{card}(S)$ does not have the same cardinality of $S$ in general, but all its elements do.)

== See also ==
- Beth number
- Gimel function
- Regular cardinal
- Infinity
- Transfinite number
- Ordinal number
