= Infinite set =

Set that is not a finite set

Set Theory Image

In set theory, an infinite set is a set that is not a finite set. Infinite sets may be countable or uncountable.

== Properties ==
The set of natural numbers (whose existence is postulated by the axiom of infinity) is infinite. It is the only set that is directly required by the axioms to be infinite. The existence of any other infinite set can be proved in Zermelo–Fraenkel set theory (ZFC), but only by showing that it follows from the existence of the natural numbers.

A set is infinite if and only if for every natural number, the set has a subset whose cardinality is that natural number.

If the axiom of choice holds, then a set is infinite if and only if it includes a countable infinite subset.

If a set of sets is infinite or contains an infinite element then its union is infinite. The power set of an infinite set is infinite. Any superset of an infinite set is infinite. If an infinite set is partitioned into finitely many subsets, then at least one of them must be infinite. Any set which can be mapped onto an infinite set is infinite. The Cartesian product of an infinite set and a nonempty set is infinite. The Cartesian product of an infinite number of sets, each containing at least two elements, is either empty or infinite; if the axiom of choice holds, then it is infinite.

Even if an index set I is infinite, the union $\cup_{i \in I} X_i$ could still be finite unless some additional assumptions are made, such as that all $X_i$ are non-empty and mutually disjoint, in which case the union would be infinite.

If an infinite set is a well-ordered set, then it must have a nonempty, nontrivial subset that has no greatest element.

In ZF, a set is infinite if and only if the power set of its power set is a Dedekind-infinite set, having a proper subset equinumerous to itself. If the axiom of choice is also true, then infinite sets are precisely the Dedekind-infinite sets.

If an infinite set is a well-orderable set, then it has many well-orderings which are non-isomorphic.

== History ==
Important ideas discussed by David Burton in his book The History of Mathematics: An Introduction include how to define "elements" or parts of a set, how to define unique elements in the set, and how to prove infinity. Burton also discusses proofs for different types of infinity, including countable and uncountable sets. Topics used when comparing infinite and finite sets include ordered sets, cardinality, equivalency, coordinate planes, universal sets, mapping, subsets, continuity, and transcendence. Cantor's set ideas were influenced by trigonometry and irrational numbers. Other key ideas in infinite set theory mentioned by Burton, Paula, Narli and Rodger include real numbers such as π, integers, and Euler's number.

Both Burton and Rogers use finite sets to start to explain infinite sets using proof concepts such as mapping, proof by induction, or proof by contradiction. Mathematical trees can also be used to understand infinite sets. Burton also discusses proofs of infinite sets including ideas such as unions and subsets.

In Chapter 12 of The History of Mathematics: An Introduction, Burton emphasizes how mathematicians such as Zermelo, Dedekind, Galileo, Kronecker, Cantor, and Bolzano investigated and influenced infinite set theory. Many of these mathematicians either debated infinity or otherwise added to the ideas of infinite sets. Potential historical influences, such as how Prussia's history in the 1800s, resulted in an increase in scholarly mathematical knowledge, including Cantor's theory of infinite sets.

One potential application of infinite set theory is in genetics and biology.

== Examples ==
=== Countably infinite sets ===
The set of all integers, {..., −1, 0, 1, 2, ...} is a countably infinite set. The set of all even integers is also a countably infinite set, even if it is a proper subset of the integers.

The set of all rational numbers is a countably infinite set as there is a bijection to the set of integers.

=== Uncountably infinite sets ===
The set of all real numbers is an uncountably infinite set. The set of all irrational numbers is also an uncountably infinite set.

The set of all subsets of the integers is uncountably infinite.

== See also ==
- Aleph number
- Cardinal number
- Ordinal number
