= Zorn's lemma =

Mathematical proposition equivalent to the axiom of choice

Zorn's lemma can be used to show that every connected graph has a spanning tree. The set of all sub-graphs that are trees is ordered by inclusion, and the union of a chain is an upper bound. Zorn's lemma says that a maximal tree must exist, which is a spanning tree since the graph is connected. Zorn's lemma is not needed for finite graphs, such as the one pictured here.

Zorn's lemma, also known as the Kuratowski–Zorn lemma, is a proposition of set theory. It states that a partially ordered set containing upper bounds for every chain (that is, every totally ordered subset) necessarily contains at least one maximal element.

The lemma was proven (assuming the axiom of choice) by Kazimierz Kuratowski in 1922 and independently by Max Zorn in 1935. It occurs in the proofs of several theorems of crucial importance, for instance the Hahn–Banach theorem in functional analysis, the theorem that every vector space has a basis, Tychonoff's theorem in topology stating that every product of compact spaces is compact, and the theorems in abstract algebra that in a ring with identity every proper ideal is contained in a maximal ideal and that every field has an algebraic closure.

Zorn's lemma is equivalent to the well-ordering theorem and also to the axiom of choice, in the sense that within ZF (Zermelo–Fraenkel set theory without the axiom of choice) any one of the three is sufficient to prove the other two. An earlier formulation of Zorn's lemma is the Hausdorff maximal principle which states that every totally ordered subset of a given partially ordered set is contained in a maximal totally ordered subset of that partially ordered set.

== Motivation ==
To prove the existence of a mathematical object that can be viewed as a maximal element in some partially ordered set in some way, one can try proving the existence of such an object by assuming there is no maximal element and using transfinite induction and the assumptions of the situation to get a contradiction. Zorn's lemma tidies up the conditions a situation needs to satisfy in order for such an argument to work and enables mathematicians to not have to repeat the transfinite induction argument by hand each time, but just check the conditions of Zorn's lemma.

If you are building a mathematical object in stages and find that (i) you have not finished even after infinitely many stages, and (ii) there seems to be nothing to stop you continuing to build, then Zorn’s lemma may well be able to help you.

— William Timothy Gowers, "How to use Zorn’s lemma"

== Statement of the lemma ==
Preliminary notions:

Partially ordered set
A set P equipped with a binary relation ≤ that is reflexive (x ≤ x for every x), antisymmetric (if both x ≤ y and y ≤ x hold, then x = y), and transitive (if x ≤ y and y ≤ z then x ≤ z) is said to be (partially) ordered by ≤. Given two elements x and y of P with x ≤ y, y is said to be greater than or equal to x. The word "partial" is meant to indicate that not every pair of elements of a partially ordered set is required to be comparable under the order relation, that is, in a partially ordered set P with order relation ≤ there may be elements x and y with neither x ≤ y nor y ≤ x. An ordered set in which every pair of elements is comparable is called totally ordered.
Chain
Every subset S of a partially ordered set P can itself be seen as partially ordered by restricting the order relation inherited from P to S. A subset S of a partially ordered set P is called a chain (in P) if it is totally ordered in the inherited order.
Maximal element
An element m of a partially ordered set P with order relation ≤ is maximal (with respect to ≤) if there is no other element of P greater than m, that is, there is no s in P with s ≠ m and m ≤ s. Depending on the order relation, a partially ordered set may have any number of maximal elements. However, a totally ordered set can have at most one maximal element.
Upper bound
Given a subset S of a partially ordered set P, an element u of P is an upper bound of S if it is greater than or equal to every element of S. Here, S is not required to be a chain, and u is required to be comparable to every element of S but need not itself be an element of S.

Zorn's lemma can then be stated as:

Zorn's lemma— Let $P$ be a partially ordered set that satisfies the following two properties:

1. $P$ is nonempty;
2. Every chain in P has an upper bound in P.

Then $P$ has at least one maximal element.

In fact, property (1) is redundant, since property (2) says, in particular, that the empty chain has an upper bound in $P$, implying $P$ is nonempty. However, in practice, one often checks (1) and then verifies (2) only for nonempty chains, since the case of the empty chain is taken care of by (1).

In the terminology of Bourbaki, a partially ordered set is called inductive if each chain has an upper bound in the set (in particular, the set is then nonempty). Then the lemma can be stated as:

Zorn's lemma— Each inductive set has a maximal element.

For some applications, the following variant may be useful.

Corollary— Let $P$ be a partially ordered set in which every chain has an upper bound and $a$ an element in $P$. Then there exists a maximal element $b$ in $P$ such that $b \ge a$.

Indeed, let $Q = \{ x \in P \mid x \ge a \}$ with the partial ordering from $P$. Then, for a chain in $Q$, an upper bound in $P$ is in $Q$ and so $Q$ satisfies the hypothesis of Zorn's lemma and a maximal element in $Q$ is a maximal element in $P$ as well.

Remark: Zorn's lemma can fail for a partially ordered class, not a set. Indeed, let P be the class of all ordinals. Then it satisfies the hypothesis of the lemma (it can be shown that the union of a chain of ordinals is again an ordinal; roughly, initial segments glue). However, $P$ has no maximal element: if $\alpha$ is a maximal ordinal, the successor of it is strictly larger. (The fact that the class of ordinals is not a set is known as the Burali-Forti paradox.)

== Example applications ==
=== Every vector space has a basis ===
Zorn's lemma can be used to show that every vector space V has a basis.

If V = {0}, then the empty set is a basis for V. Now, suppose that V ≠ {0}. Let P be the set consisting of all linearly independent subsets of V. Since V is not the zero vector space, there exists a nonzero element v of V, so P contains the linearly independent subset {v}. Furthermore, P is partially ordered by set inclusion (see inclusion order). Finding a maximal linearly independent subset of V is the same as finding a maximal element in P.

To apply Zorn's lemma, take a chain T in P (that is, T is a subset of P that is totally ordered). If T is the empty set, then {v} is an upper bound for T in P. Suppose then that T is non-empty. We need to show that T has an upper bound, that is, there exists a linearly independent subset B of V containing all the members of T.

Take B to be the union of all the sets in T. We wish to show that B is an upper bound for T in P. To do this, it suffices to show that B is a linearly independent subset of V.

Suppose otherwise, that B is not linearly independent. Then there exists vectors v_{1}, v_{2}, ..., v_{k} ∈ B and scalars a_{1}, a_{2}, ..., a_{k}, not all zero, such that

$$a_1\mathbf{v}_1 + a_2\mathbf{v}_2 + \cdots + a_k\mathbf{v}_k = \mathbf{0}.$$

Since B is the union of all the sets in T, there are some sets S_{1}, S_{2}, ..., S_{k} ∈ T such that v_{i} ∈ S_{i} for every i = 1, 2, ..., k. As T is totally ordered, one of the sets S_{1}, S_{2}, ..., S_{k} must contain the others, so there is some set S_{i} that contains all of v_{1}, v_{2}, ..., v_{k}. This tells us there is a linearly dependent set of vectors in S_{i}, contradicting that S_{i} is linearly independent (because it is a member of P).

The hypothesis of Zorn's lemma has been checked, and thus there is a maximal element in P, in other words a maximal linearly independent subset B of V.

Finally, we show that B is indeed a basis of V. It suffices to show that B is a spanning set of V. Suppose for the sake of contradiction that B is not spanning. Then there exists some v ∈ V not covered by the span of B. This says that B ∪ {v} is a linearly independent subset of V that is larger than B, contradicting the maximality of B. Therefore, B is a spanning set of V, and thus, a basis of V.

Remark: While less common, it is possible to construct a basis somehow more directly using transfinite recursion, still assuming the axiom of choice. For that, see for example Transfinite recursion theorem § Example: a basis construction as a comparison.

=== Every nontrivial ring with unity contains a maximal ideal ===
Zorn's lemma can be used to show that every nontrivial ring R with unity contains a maximal ideal.

Let P be the set consisting of all proper ideals in R (that is, all ideals in R except R itself). Since R is non-trivial, the set P contains the trivial ideal {0}. Furthermore, P is partially ordered by set inclusion. Finding a maximal ideal in R is the same as finding a maximal element in P.

To apply Zorn's lemma, take a chain T in P. If T is empty, then the trivial ideal {0} is an upper bound for T in P. Assume then that T is non-empty. It is necessary to show that T has an upper bound, that is, there exists an ideal I ⊆ R containing all the members of T but still smaller than R (otherwise it would not be a proper ideal, so it is not in P).

Take I to be the union of all the ideals in T. We wish to show that I is an upper bound for T in P. We will first show that I is an ideal of R. For I to be an ideal, it must satisfy three conditions:

1. I is a nonempty subset of R,
2. For every x, y ∈ I, the sum x + y is in I,
3. For every r ∈ R and every x ∈ I, the product rx is in I.

#1 - I is a nonempty subset of R.

Because T contains at least one element, and that element contains at least 0, the union I contains at least 0 and is not empty. Every element of T is a subset of R, so the union I only consists of elements in R.

#2 - For every x, y ∈ I, the sum x + y is in I.

Suppose x and y are elements of I. Then there exist two ideals J, K ∈ T such that x is an element of J and y is an element of K. Since T is totally ordered, we know that J ⊆ K or K ⊆ J. Without loss of generality, assume the first case. Both x and y are members of the ideal K, therefore their sum x + y is a member of K, which shows that x + y is a member of I.

#3 - For every r ∈ R and every x ∈ I, the product rx is in I.

Suppose x is an element of I. Then there exists an ideal J ∈ T such that x is in J. If r ∈ R, then rx is an element of J and hence an element of I. Thus, I is an ideal in R.

Now, we show that I is a proper ideal. An ideal is equal to R if and only if it contains 1. (It is clear that if it is R then it contains 1; on the other hand, if it contains 1 and r is an arbitrary element of R, then r1 = r is an element of the ideal, and so the ideal is equal to R.) So, if I were equal to R, then it would contain 1, and that means one of the members of T would contain 1 and would thus be equal to R – but R is explicitly excluded from P.

The hypothesis of Zorn's lemma has been checked, and thus there is a maximal element in P, in other words a maximal ideal in R.

=== A proof of Tychonoff's theorem ===
Zorn's lemma implies the ultrafilter lemma, which in turn implies Tychonoff's theorem (together with the axiom of choice). However, it is also possible to prove Tychonoff's theorem directly from Zorn's lemma as follows (by using an ultrafilter implicitly).

Let $X_i$ be a family of compact spaces, not necessarily Hausdorff. We shall show that a family $F$ of closed subsets of $X := \prod_i X_i$ with the finite intersection property has nonempty intersection. Let $P$ be the collection of all the families of subsets of $X$ with the finite intersection property (not necessarily closed subsets). We let $P$ be ordered by set inclusion. If $C \subset P$ is a chain, then clearly the union of $C$ has the finite intersection property; so, the union is in $P$. Thus, by Zorn's lemma, there is a maximal element $M$ in $P$ containing $F$. We shall show that the intersection of all the closed sets in $M$ has nonempty intersection; a fortiori, $F$ has nonempty intersection.

For each finite subset $M' \subset M$, since $\cap M'$ is nonempty, $\cap p_i(M')$ is nonempty for the projection $p_i : X \to X_i.$ Thus, for each $i$, the set

$$N_i := \left \{ \overline{p_i(A)} \mid A \in M \right \}$$

has nonempty intersection since it has the finite intersection property and $X_i$ is compact. We note

1. If $M' \subset M$ is a finite subset, $\cap M'$ is in $M$.
2. For an open set $U_i$ intersecting $\cap N_i$, we have $p_i^{-1}(U_i)$ is in $M$.

Indeed, (1) holds since $M = M \cup \{ \cap M' \}$ by maximality, as the set on the right has the finite intersection property. Similarly, for a finite subset $M' \subset M$, since $A = \cap M'$ is in $M$, $U_i \cap p_i(A) \ne \emptyset$ or $p_i^{-1}(U_i) \cap A \ne \emptyset$. Thus, the set $M \cup \{ p_i^{-1}(U_i) \}$ has the finite intersection property and (2) follows by the maximality of $M$.

Now, by the axiom of choice, we can find an element $m$ in $\prod_i (\cap N_i)$. We claim this $m$ is in each closed set $A$ in $M$. Since $A$ is closed, it is enough to show $m$ is in the closure of $A$; i.e., each basic neighborhood of $m$ intersects $A$. A basic neighborhood of $m$ has the form $\cap_{j=1}^r p_{i_j}^{-1}(U_{i_j})$. But by the property (2) above, we have $\left \{ A, p_{i_j}^{-1}(U_{i_j}) \mid j = 1, \dots, r \right \} \subset M$, which gives the claim by the finite intersection property. $\square$

Remark: The ultrafilter lemma is strictly weaker than the axiom of choice; it is equivalent to the boolean prime ideal theorem. On the other hand, somehow surprisingly, Tychonoff's theorem implies (thus is equivalent to) the axiom of choice. Hence, the use of AC above cannot be eliminated. (If $X_i$ are compact Hausdorff, then the use of AC can be eliminated; indeed, each $\cap p_i(M)$ above has exactly one point in that case.)

An alternative (perhaps more standard) proof of Tychonoff's theorem is to first prove Alexander's subbase lemma, but the proof of that lemma typically uses Zorn's lemma.

== Equivalent formulations ==
There are some equivalent formulations of Zorn's lemma, although they are not commonly used in applications. A poset is short for a partially ordered set.

Proposition—Then the following are equivalent (without assuming the axiom of choice)

1. (Zorn) If each chain in a poset $P$ has an upper bound, then $P$ has a maximal element.
2. If each chain in a poset $P$ has a least upper bound; i.e., $P$ is chain-complete, then $P$ has a maximal element.
3. (Hausdorff maximal principle) The set of all chains in some poset, ordered by set inclusion, has a maximal element (that is, a maximal chain in the poset).
4. (Tukey) Let $F$ be a nonempty family of sets that has finite character; i.e., a set is in $F$ if and only if each finite subset of that set is in $F$. Then $F$ has a maximal element with respect to set inclusion.
5. Let $F$ be a family of sets such that for each chain $C$ in $F$, the union of $C$ is a subset of a set in $F$. Then $F$ has a maximal element.

Indeed, (1) $\Rightarrow$ (5) holds since a set in $F$ containing the union of a chain in $F$ is an upper bound of the chain. (5) $\Rightarrow$ (4) is because an easy argument shows the union of a chain in $F$ is again in $F$. (4) $\Rightarrow$ (3) since the set of all chains clearly has finite character. (3) $\Rightarrow$ (2) Let $C$ be a maximal chain. It has a least upper bound $x$ by the hypothesis on $P$. This $x$ is a maximal element since if $y > x$, then $\widetilde{C} = C \cup \{ y \}$ is a strictly larger chain, contradicting the maximality of $C$. For (2) $\Rightarrow$ (1), apply (2) to the poset of all chains (the ordering by set inclusion). As before, an upper bound of a maximal chain is a maximal element of $P$. $\square$

If we assume the axiom of choice, or, more specifically, if we assume the existence of a choice function for a given poset $P$,

$$c : \mathcal{P}(P) - \{ \emptyset \} \to P$$

then Zorn's lemma for that particular $P$ is equivalent to

If each chain in $P$ has an upper bound, then each function $f : P \to P$ such that $x \le f(x), \, x \in P$ has a fixed point. (Such $f$ is called an inflationary map.)

Indeed, if Zorn's lemma holds, a maximal element is a fixed point. Conversely, assuming the above, define the function $f : P \to P$ by $f(x) = x$ if $x$ is maximal and $f(x) = c(x^*)$ otherwise, where $x^* = \{ y \mid y > x \}$ is the strict upper set of $x$. A fixed point of this $f$ is exactly a maximal element. $\square$

In fact, the above statement is used in a standard proof of Zorn's lemma (§ Proof by transfinite recursion); namely, we construct a transfinite sequence $x_{\alpha}$ by iteratively applying $f$. Then, for "size" reason, the sequence cannot be strictly increasing; i.e., $f$ must have a fixed point.

== Proof ==
Assuming the axiom of choice, Zorn's lemma can be proved in multiple ways.

=== Proof by transfinite recursion ===
Let $P$ be a partially ordered set in which each chain, including the empty chain, has an upper bound. Define the function

$$f : P \to P$$

by $f(x) = x$ if $x$ is a maximal element and $f(x) = c(\{ y \mid y > x \})$ otherwise, where

$$c : \mathcal{P}(P) - \{ \emptyset \} \to P$$

is a choice function; namely, $c(S) \in S$. Note a maximal element of $P$ is exactly a fixed point of $f$. Thus, the proof is equivalent to finding a fixed point of $f$.

Informally, we are going to construct a very long sequence (transfinite sequence) by repeatedly applying $f$. That is, first pick some $x_0$ in $P$, possible since $P$ is nonempty. Then let $x_1 = f(x_0)$ and then let $x_2 = f(x_1)$ and so on. If we have used up all the natural numbers, then, to continue, we let

$$x_{\omega} = c(\{\text{upper bounds of the chain } \, x_0 \le x_1 \le \cdots \})$$

where $\omega = \{ 0, 1, 2, \cdots \}$. Then let $x_{\omega + 1} = f(x_{\omega})$ and so on. This procedure yields a sequence of length $\alpha$ for each ordinal $\alpha$,

$$x_0 \le x_1 \le \cdots \le x_{\omega} \le x_{\omega + 1} \le \cdots$$

Note as long as the sequence is increasing, the map $\alpha \to P, \, \beta \mapsto x_{\beta}$ is injective. But a set cannot contains a subset of greater cardinality. So, if the sequence is too long, it cannot be increasing and a term in the sequence such that $x_{\beta} = x_{\beta + 1}$ is a fixed point of $f$ (that is, a maximal element of $P$).

Formally, the above sequence is defined using transfinite recursion. It is exactly like the usual recursive definition of a sequence but runs over ordinals. A key difference is that an ordinal may be a limit ordinal, like $\omega$. For a limit ordinal $\alpha$, as above, we take $x_{\alpha}$ to be some upper bound of the sequence $x_{\beta}, \beta < \alpha$ via $c$. (See also Transfinite recursion theorem § Example: a proof of Zorn's lemma for more details on this kind of recursive construction.) Finally, we need a sufficiently large ordinal. By the axiom of choice in the form of the well-ordering theorem, we can find an ordinal $\kappa$ that is bijective with $P.$ Take $\alpha = \kappa^+$, the successor cardinal (= least ordinal whose cardinality is larger than $\kappa$). Then, for the reason of cardinality, $\kappa^+ \not\hookrightarrow P, \, \beta \mapsto x_{\beta}$; i.e., the sequence $x_{\beta}$ is not strictly increasing and so some term in it is a fixed point. (Incidentally, this $\kappa^+$ is called the Hartogs number of $P$.)

Alternatively, if we are using the foundation allowing classes; e.g., has a fixed Grothendieck universe, then the above procedure, if $f$ has no fixed point, constructs an injection:

$$\operatorname{Ord} \hookrightarrow P$$

where $\operatorname{Ord}$ is the class of all ordinals (in the universe). But the existence of such an injection is a contradiction known as the Burali-Forti paradox. $\square$

The above proof can be formulated without explicitly referring to ordinals but by considering the initial segments of well-ordered sets, an argument due to Kneser. (cf. Bourbaki–Witt theorem § Proof 3 for more details.)

Let $\Gamma$ be the set of all well-ordered chains $C$ in $P$ such that, for each $x$ in $C$,

$$x = s(\{ y \in C \mid y < x \})$$

where $g(S) = c(\{ \text{upper bounds of } S \})$ and $s = f \circ g$. We note $\Gamma$ is totally ordered, with respect to the ordering by initial segments: indeed, for $C, D$ in $\Gamma$, let $S$ be the union of all common initial segments of them, which is also an initial segment. Then we easily see either $C = S$ or $D = S$. Finally, let $U$ be the union of $\Gamma$ and then we can see $U$ itself is in $\Gamma$. Since $s(U) \in U$ and $g(U)$ is an upper bound of $U$,

$$f(g(U)) \le g(U).$$

That is, $g(U)$ is a fixed point of $f$. $\square$

This proof shows that actually a slightly stronger version of Zorn's lemma is true:

Lemma—If P is a poset in which every well-ordered chain has an upper bound, then P has a maximal element.

=== Proof from the Hausdorff maximal principle ===
The Hausdorff maximal principle is an alternative formulation of Zorn's lemma asserting that every partially ordered set $P$ has a maximal chain $C \subset P$ with respect to set inclusion.

The usual form of Zorn's lemma follows from the Hausdorff maximal principle, since if $P$ satisfies the hypothesis of Zorn's lemma, then its maximal chain $C$ also has an upper bound $x$ in $P$. This $x$ is a maximal element since if $y > x$, then $\widetilde{C} = C \cup \{ y \}$ is a strictly larger chain than $C$, contradicting the maximality of $C$.

Conversely, the Hausdorff maximal principle also follows from Zorn's lemma by regarding the set of chains as a partially ordered set ordered by set inclusion. In fact, this specific case only needs the following weak form of Zorn's lemma:

Lemma 1—Let $P$ be a partially ordered set in which each chain has a least upper bound in $P$. Then $P$ has a maximal element.

Or the following even weaker form:

Lemma 2—Let $F$ be a set consisting of subsets of some fixed set such that $F$ satisfies the following properties:

1. The union of each totally ordered subsets of $F$ is in $F$, where the ordering is with respect to set inclusion.
2. For each set $S$ in $F$, each subset of $S$ is in $F$.

Then $F$ has a maximal element with respect to set inclusion.

This is a weaker form since that the union of each chain of $F$ is a least upper bound of that chain. This cycle of implications (Zorn's lemma ⇒ Lemma 1 ⇒ Lemma 2 ⇒ Hausdorff maximal principle ⇒ Zorn's lemma) shows that all these forms are in fact equivalent.

Lemma 2 can then be directly proved from the axiom of choice, as shown in Hausdorff maximal principle § Proof 1.

The Bourbaki–Witt theorem can also be used to give a proof of the Lemma 1, by considering the map $f : P \to P$ such that $f(x) = x$ if $x$ is maximal and $f(x) > x$ otherwise (such $f$ exists by the axiom of choice). Alternatively, since the set of all chains in a poset is a dcpo with a least element, Pataraia's theorem can be used instead to prove the Hausdorff maximal principle; thus, Zorn's lemma.

== Zorn's lemma implies the axiom of choice ==
A proof that Zorn's lemma implies the axiom of choice illustrates a typical application of Zorn's lemma. (The structure of the proof is exactly the same as the one for the Hahn–Banach theorem.)

Given a set $X$ of nonempty sets and its union $U := \bigcup X$ (which exists by the axiom of union), we want to show there is a function

$$f : X \to U$$

such that $f(S) \in S$ for each $S \in X$. For that end, consider the set

$$P = \{ f : Y \to U \mid Y \subset X, f(S) \in S\text{ for each }S \in Y \}$$.

It is partially ordered by extension; i.e., $f \le g$ if and only if $f$ is the restriction of $g$. If $f_i : Y_i \to U$ is a chain in $P$, then we can define the function $f$ on the union $Y = \cup_i Y_i$ by setting $f(x) = f_i(x)$ when $x \in Y_i$. This is well-defined since if $i < j$, then $f_i$ is the restriction of $f_j$. The function $f$ is also an element of $P$ and is a common extension of all $f_i$'s. Thus, we have shown that each chain in $P$ has an upper bound in $P$. Hence, by Zorn's lemma, there is a maximal element $f$ in $P$ that is defined on some $Y \subset X$. We want to show $Y = X$. Suppose otherwise; then there is a set $S \in X - Y$. As $S$ is nonempty, it contains an element $s$. We can then extend $f$ to a function $g$ on $Y \cup \{ S \}$ by setting $g|_{Y} = f$ and $g(S) = s$. (Note this step does not need the axiom of choice.) The function $g$ is in $P$ and $f < g$, a contradiction to the maximality of $f$. $\square$

Essentially the same proof also shows that Zorn's lemma implies the well-ordering theorem: take $P$ to be the set of all well-ordered subsets of a given set $X$, ordered by initial segments, and then shows a maximal element of $P$ is $X$. For a proof of the converse (in the form of the maximal principle), see Hausdorff maximal principle § Proof from the well-ordering theorem.

Remark: In the above, we could have used a directed set instead of a chain. Indeed, let $f_i : Y_i \to U$ be a directed set in $P$. For each $i, j$, there is a $k \ge i, j$ by directedness. That is, the pair $f_i, f_j$ has a common extension $f_k$; in particular, $f_i, f_j$ agree on $Y_i \cap Y_j$. Hence, we can define $f$ on $Y$ by $f|_{Y_i} = f_i$. Thus, the axiom of choice actually ensues from the following seemingly weaker statement

Lemma—Let $P$ be a dcpo with a least element, where a dcpo is a partially ordered set in which each directed set has a least upper bound. Then $P$ has a maximal element.

As a nonempty chain is a directed set, Zorn's lemma implies the above lemma, which as we noted implies the axiom of choice. Thus, the above lemma is equivalent to Zorn's lemma.

== History ==
The Hausdorff maximal principle is an early statement similar to Zorn's lemma.

Kazimierz Kuratowski proved in 1922 a version of the lemma close to its modern formulation (it applies to sets ordered by inclusion and closed under unions of well-ordered chains). Essentially the same formulation (weakened by using arbitrary chains, not just well-ordered) was independently given by Max Zorn in 1935, who proposed it as a new axiom of set theory replacing the well-ordering theorem, exhibited some of its applications in algebra, and promised to show its equivalence with the axiom of choice in another paper, which never appeared.

The name "Zorn's lemma" appears to be due to John Tukey, who used it in his book Convergence and Uniformity in Topology in 1940. Bourbaki's Théorie des Ensembles of 1939 refers to a similar maximal principle as "le théorème de Zorn". The name "Kuratowski–Zorn lemma" prevails in Poland and Russia.

== Equivalent forms of Zorn's lemma ==
Zorn's lemma is equivalent (in ZF) to three main results:

1. Hausdorff maximal principle
2. Axiom of choice
3. Well-ordering theorem.

A well-known joke alluding to this equivalency (which may defy human intuition) is attributed to Jerry Bona: "The Axiom of Choice is obviously true, the well-ordering principle obviously false, and who can tell about Zorn's lemma?"

Zorn's lemma is also equivalent to the strong completeness theorem of first-order logic.

Moreover, Zorn's lemma (or one of its equivalent forms) implies some major results in other mathematical areas. For example,

1. Banach's extension theorem which is used to prove one of the most fundamental results in functional analysis, the Hahn–Banach theorem
2. Every vector space has a basis, a result from linear algebra (to which it is equivalent). In particular, the real numbers, as a vector space over the rational numbers, possess a Hamel basis.
3. Every commutative unital ring has a maximal ideal, a result from ring theory known as Krull's theorem, to which Zorn's lemma is equivalent
4. Tychonoff's theorem in topology (to which it is also equivalent)
5. Every proper filter is contained in an ultrafilter, a result that yields the completeness theorem of first-order logic

In this sense, Zorn's lemma is a powerful tool, applicable to many areas of mathematics.

=== Analogs under weakenings of the axiom of choice ===
A weakened form of Zorn's lemma can be proven from ZF + DC (Zermelo–Fraenkel set theory with the axiom of choice replaced by the axiom of dependent choice). Zorn's lemma can be expressed straightforwardly by observing that the set having no maximal element would be equivalent to stating that the set's ordering relation would be entire, which would allow us to apply the axiom of dependent choice to construct a countable chain. As a result, any partially ordered set with exclusively finite chains must have a maximal element.

More generally, strengthening the axiom of dependent choice to higher ordinals allows us to generalize the statement in the previous paragraph to higher cardinalities. In the limit where we allow arbitrarily large ordinals, we recover the proof of the full Zorn's lemma using the axiom of choice in the preceding section.

== Preorder version ==
There is a version of Zorn's lemma for a preordered set. In that case, we need to be a bit careful about the definition of a maximal element. Precisely, it states

Zorn's lemma— Let $(P, \lesssim)$ be a preordered set such that each chain in it has an upper bound. Then P contains an element x such that $x \lesssim y \Rightarrow y \lesssim x$ for each element y in P.

This version trivially follows from the usual Zorn's lemma. Indeed, consider the quotient

$$Q = P/\sim$$

where $x \sim y$ means $x \lesssim y$ and $y \lesssim x$. Then $Q$ is a partially ordered set satisfying the hypothesis of Zorn's lemma and thus has a maximal element. $\square$

== In popular culture ==
The 1970 film Zorns Lemma is named after the lemma.

The lemma was referenced on The Simpsons in the episode "Bart's New Friend".

== See also ==
- Antichain – Subset of incomparable elements
- Szpilrajn extension theorem – Mathematical result on order relations
- Tarski finiteness – Finite collection of distinct objects
