= Teichmüller–Tukey lemma =

In mathematics, the Teichmüller–Tukey lemma (sometimes named just Tukey's lemma), named after John Tukey and Oswald Teichmüller, is a lemma that states that every nonempty collection of finite character has a maximal element with respect to inclusion. Over Zermelo–Fraenkel set theory, the Teichmüller–Tukey lemma is equivalent to the axiom of choice, and therefore to the well-ordering theorem, Zorn's lemma, and the Hausdorff maximal principle.

== Definitions ==
A family of sets $\mathcal{F}$ is of finite character provided it has the following properties:

1. For each $A\in \mathcal{F}$, every finite subset of $A$ belongs to $\mathcal{F}$.
2. If every finite subset of a given set $A$ belongs to $\mathcal{F}$, then $A$ belongs to $\mathcal{F}$.

== Statement of the lemma ==
Let $Z$ be a set and let $\mathcal{F}\subseteq\mathcal{P}(Z)$. If $\mathcal{F}$ is of finite character and $X\in\mathcal{F}$, then there is a maximal $Y\in\mathcal{F}$ (according to the inclusion relation) such that $X\subseteq Y$.

== Applications ==
In linear algebra, the lemma may be used to show the existence of a basis. Let V be a vector space. Consider the collection $\mathcal{F}$ of linearly independent sets of vectors. This is a collection of finite character. Thus, a maximal set exists, which must then span V and be a basis for V.
