= Tarski's theorem about choice =

Theorem equivalent to the Axiom of Choice

In mathematics, Tarski's theorem, proved by Alfred Tarski (1924), states that in ZF the statement "For every infinite set $A$, there is a bijective map between the sets $A$ and $A\times A$" implies the axiom of choice. The opposite direction was already known (provable via an explicit pairing function for any aleph number), thus the statement and axiom of choice are equivalent.

Tarski told Jan Mycielski (2006) that when he tried to publish the theorem in Comptes Rendus de l'Académie des Sciences de Paris, Fréchet and Lebesgue refused to present it. Fréchet wrote that an implication between two well known propositions is not a new result. Lebesgue wrote that an implication between two false propositions is of no interest.

== Proof ==
The goal is to prove that the axiom of choice is implied by the statement "for every infinite set $A:$ $|A| = |A \times A|$". It is known that the well-ordering theorem is equivalent to the axiom of choice; thus it is enough to show that the statement implies that for every set $B$ there exists a well-order.

Since the collection of all ordinals such that there exists a surjective function from $B$ to the ordinal is a set, there exists an infinite ordinal, $\beta,$ such that there is no surjective function from $B$ to $\beta.$ We assume without loss of generality that the sets $B$ and $\beta$ are disjoint. By the initial assumption, $|B \cup \beta| = |(B \cup \beta) \times (B \cup \beta)|,$ thus there exists a bijection $f : B \cup \beta \to (B \cup \beta) \times (B \cup \beta).$

For every $x \in B,$ it is impossible that $\beta \times \{x\} \subseteq f[B],$ because otherwise we could define a surjective function from $B$ to $\beta.$ Therefore, there exists at least one ordinal $\gamma \in \beta$ such that $f(\gamma) \in \beta \times \{x\},$ so the set $S_x = \{\gamma : f(\gamma) \in \beta \times \{x\}\}$ is not empty.

We can define a new function: $g(x) = \min S_x.$ This function is well defined since $S_x$ is a non-empty set of ordinals, and so has a minimum. For every $x, y \in B, x \neq y$ the sets $S_x$ and $S_y$ are disjoint. Therefore, we can define a well order on $B,$ for every $x, y \in B$ we define $x \leq y \iff g(x) \leq g(y),$ since the image of $g,$ that is, $g[B]$ is a set of ordinals and therefore well ordered.
