= Krull's theorem =

Part of ring theory in mathematics

In mathematics, and more specifically in ring theory, Krull's theorem, named after Wolfgang Krull, asserts that a nonzero ring has at least one maximal ideal. The theorem was proved in 1929 by Krull, who used transfinite induction. The theorem admits a simple proof using Zorn's lemma, and in fact is equivalent to Zorn's lemma, which in turn is equivalent to the axiom of choice.

== Variants ==
- For noncommutative rings, the analogues for maximal left ideals and maximal right ideals also hold.
- For pseudo-rings, the theorem holds for regular ideals.
- An apparently slightly stronger (but equivalent) result, which can be proved in a similar fashion, is as follows:

Let R be a nonzero ring, and let I be a proper ideal of R. Then there is a maximal ideal of R containing I.

The statement of the original theorem can be obtained by taking I to be the zero ideal (0). Conversely, applying the original theorem to R/I leads to this result.
To prove the "stronger" result directly, consider the set S of all proper ideals of R containing I. The set S is nonempty since I ∈ S. Furthermore, for any chain T of S, the union of the ideals in T is an ideal J, and a union of ideals not containing 1 does not contain 1, so J ∈ S. By Zorn's lemma, S has a maximal element M. This M is a maximal ideal containing I.
