= Transfinite recursion theorem =

Mathematical theorem

In mathematics, the transfinite recursion theorem says a function can be defined using a recursion over a well-ordered set; for example, $\mathbb{N}$ but also over general well-ordered sets.

Since each well-ordered set is isomorphic to an ordinal, the theorem is also often stated in terms of ordinals.

== Statements ==
Transfinite recursion is an instance of transfinite induction and the latter works over a well-ordered set (in fact, the feasibility of such an induction is equivalent to well-ordered-ness). In particular, the theorem can be stated for well-ordered sets. If $A$ is a partially ordered set, we write $A^a = \{ b \in A \mid b < a \}.$

Transfinite recursion theorem —Let a set $X$, a well-ordered set $A$ and a function

$$G : \{ A^a \to X \mid a \in A \} \to X$$

be given. Then there exists a unique function

$$f : A \to X$$

such that

$$f(a) = G(f|_{A^a})$$

for each $a$ in $A$, where the vertical bar means restriction.

The transfinite recursion theorem is also commonly stated for ordinals. One simple version is: let a set $X$ and a class function $G$ with values in $X$ defined on the class of all functions be given. Then, for each ordinal $\alpha$, there exists a unique function

$$f : \alpha \to X$$

such that, for every ordinal $\beta < \alpha$; that is, $\beta \in \alpha$ or $\beta \subsetneq \alpha$,

$$f(\beta) = G(f|_{\beta})$$.

Since an ordinal is a well-ordered set, the above version follows from the well-ordered version (as $\beta = \alpha^{\beta}$). Although it is common to ask $G$ to be defined for all functions, this is just a convenient way of stating the theorem. In practice, one usually only defines $G(f)$ for functions $f : \alpha \to X$, $\alpha$ all ordinals, and then extends $G$ for all other functions arbitrary.

== Proof ==
When $A = \mathbb{N}$, the proof here appears in N. Jacobson's Basic Algebra I and exactly the same proof goes through for an arbitrary well-ordered set. The proof itself is taken from Halmos.

We say a subset $E \subset A \times X$ is closed (with respect to $G$) if for each function $f : A^a \to X, \, a \in A$ whose graph is contained in $E$, we have $(a, G(f))$ is in $E$. For example, $A \times X$ is closed.

Let $F$ be the intersection of all closed subsets of $A \times X$ (with respect to $G$), which is again closed. We shall prove $F$ is a graph of a function $A \to X$; that is, the fiber $p^{-1}(a)$ for the projection $p : F \subset A \times X \to A$ has exactly one element for each $a$ in $A$. For this, we shall use strong induction over $A$. That is, assuming $\# p^{-1}(b) = 1$ for every $b < a$, we show $\# p^{-1}(a) = 1$.

By inductive hypothesis, we have the function $f : A^a \to X, \, b \mapsto \text{unique element in }p^{-1}(b)$. Note the graph of it lies in $F$. Since $F$ is closed, $(a, G(f))$ is in $F$. Thus, $\# p^{-1}(a) \ge 1$. To show it is the equality, suppose otherwise. That means there is some pair $(a, y) \ne (a, G(f))$ in $F$. We claim the set

$$E := F - \{ (a, y) \}$$

is closed. Thus, let $g : A^b \to X$ be a function whose graph lies in $E$. If $b = a$, then we have $f = g$ by inductive hypothesis; indeed, since their graphs lie in $F$,

$$\{ f(c), g(c) \} \subset p^{-1}(c)$$

for each $c < a$. Thus, $(b, G(g)) \in E$ since $y \neq G(f) = G(g)$ and $F$ is closed. If $b \ne a$, then again $(b, G(g))$ is in $E$ as $F$ is closed. This proves the claim and then $E \subsetneq F$ is a contradiction to the smallest-ness of $F$. Finally, the uniqueness holds by a similar but easier induction. $\square$

== Examples ==
=== Example: a basis construction ===
Let $V$ be a vector space. There is a "very obvious" way to construct a basis of $V$ as follows. If $V \ne 0$, pick a nonzero vector $v_1$ and then pick another nonzero vector $v_2$ not in the span of $v_1$, if any, and so on. Transfinite recursion can make this argument rigorous, as we now show (alternatively, one can use Zorn's lemma; see Zorn's lemma § Every vector space has a basis.)

Let the above $V$ be given a well-ordering by the well-ordering theorem. Suppose we are given a sequence of vectors $x_{\gamma}$ indexed by an ordinal $\beta$. That is, we are given a function $f : \beta \to V$ such that $f(\gamma) = x_{\gamma}$ for each $\gamma \in \beta$ (or $\gamma < \beta$). Then let

$G(f) =$ the least element in the complement $V - \operatorname{span}(\operatorname{im}(f))$

if $V \ne \operatorname{span}(\operatorname{im}(f))$ and $G(f) = 0$ otherwise. Note, since $f$ is arbitrary, the image of $f$ is not necessarily linearly independent; all we have is that $G(f)$ is linearly independent from the nonzero vectors in $\operatorname{im}(f)$.

The transfinite recursion theorem then says: given an ordinal $\alpha$, there exists a unique $f : \alpha \to V$ that satisfies the recursion condition; i.e., $f(\beta) = G(f|_{\beta})$ is linearly independent from $\operatorname{im}(f|_{\beta})$ for $\beta < \alpha$. In particular, the nonzero vectors in the image of $f$ are linearly independent. Finally, if we take $\alpha = \kappa$ to be some large ordinal; e.g., take $\kappa$ to have cardinality strictly larger than that of $V$, then, for the reason of cardinality,

$$B := \operatorname{im}(f : \kappa \to V) - \{ 0 \}$$

is a basis of $V$. (Note, unlike a construction by Zorn's lemma, this basis is uniquely determined by a choice of a well-ordering on $V$.)

=== Example: a proof of Zorn's lemma ===
Transfinite recursion is used in a typical proof of Zorn's lemma, assuming the axiom of choice. Here is an argument (which is fairly similar to the construction of a basis above).

Let $X$ be a partially ordered set in which each chain, including the empty chain, has an upper bound. To show $X$ has a maximal element, suppose, on the contrary, that it has none. Then each chain $C$ has a strict upper bound; i.e., an element $x$ in $X$ such that $x > y$ for each $y$ in $C$, since it has an upper bound which is bounded by some strictly larger element. Let $c : \mathfrak{P}(X) - \{ \emptyset \} \to X$ be a choice function; i.e., $c(S) \in S$ and then for each chain $C$ in $X$, let

$$b(C) = c(\{ \text{strict upper bounds of }C \}).$$

We now recursively construct a sequence over ordinals. For each function $f : \beta \to X$, let $G(f) = b(\operatorname{im}(f))$ if $\operatorname{im}(f)$ is a chain and otherwise $G(f) =$ some arbitrary element in $X$; e.g., $b(\emptyset)$. By the transfinite recursion theorem, we find a function $f : \alpha \to X$ such that $f(\beta) = G(f|_{\beta})$ for $\beta < \alpha$; in particular, it is injective. But this is a contradiction since there is an ordinal whose cardinality is strictly larger than that of $X$ (see Hartogs number). If one is not sure about the existence of a large ordinal, there is also an argument that avoids ordinals altogether (still using transfinite recursion). See e.g., Hausdorff maximal principle § Proof from the well-ordering theorem. $\square$

== Recursion with the axiom of replacement ==
For some use of transfinite recursion, we may need to construction a function with values in a class; in that case, we need to use the axiom of replacement to ensure we still get the function $f$ even though the codomain is a class.

Here is an example of such a need. Suppose we want to show

Each well-ordered set is uniquely isomorphic to a unique ordinal.

The problem is that, a priori, we don’t know what ordinal to use. Thus, at each stage in transfinite induction, we construct a new ordinal. Precisely, given a well-ordered set $X$ and an element $a$ in $X$, suppose we have constructed

$$g_b : X^b \overset{\sim}\to \alpha_b$$

where $X^b = \{ c \mid c < b \}$. We shall extend these isomorphisms to an isomorphism $X^a \simeq \alpha$ for some ordinal $\alpha$. If $a = s(b)$ is a successor; i.e., the least element among strict upper bounds of $b$, then we let $f|_{X^b} = g_b$ and $f(a) = \alpha_b$. Then

$$f : X^a \overset{\sim}\to s(\alpha_b) := \alpha_b \cup \{ \alpha_b \},$$

where the union on the right exists by the axiom of union. If $a = \sup(X^a)$, then, thinking $g_b$ as sets of ordered pairs, let

$$f = \bigcup_{b < a} g_b.$$

The union on the right is a set by the axiom of replacement and the axiom of union; indeed, the former guarantees the collection $\{ g_b \mid b < a \}$ is a set. Let $\alpha$ be the image of $f$, which is clearly an ordinal, and $f : X^a \overset{\sim}\to \alpha$. Finally, we check the uniqueness. By transfinite induction, we see isomorphisms between ordinals are the identities. Then given $f : X \overset{\sim}\to \alpha, g : X \overset{\sim}\to \beta$, we have $g \circ f^{-1} : \alpha \overset{\sim}\to \beta$ is the identity and so $f = g$. $\square$

The same argument can be used to prove the transfinite recursion theorem when the target $X$ is a class. The proof is by strong induction over ordinals (the same proof works for well-ordered sets but we use ordinals for simplicity). Thus, assume the theorem is true for every $\beta < \alpha$. By inductive hypothesis, for each $\beta < \alpha$, we have a unique function $g_{\beta} : \beta \to X$ satisfying the recursion condition. Let $h_{\beta} : \beta \to X$ be given by $\gamma \mapsto G(g_{\beta}|_{\gamma})$. In the limit case; i.e., $\alpha$ is a limit ordinal, identifying functions with their graphs, consider the union

$$\bigcup_{\beta < \alpha} h_{\beta}.$$

The formation of a union is justified by the axiom of union but for the above union to be a set, we need the collection

$$\{ h_{\beta} \mid \beta < \alpha \}$$

to be a set; in other words, the image of the map $\beta \mapsto h_{\beta}$ to be a set and that is ensured by the axiom of replacement. Finally, this union is the graph of a function $f : \alpha \to X$ that satisfies the required recursion condition. The successor case is handled similarly. $\square$
