= Axiom of dependent choice =

Weak form of the axiom of choice

In mathematics, the axiom of dependent choice, denoted by $\mathsf{DC}$, is a weak form of the axiom of choice ($\mathsf{AC}$) that is still sufficient to develop much of real analysis. It was introduced by Paul Bernays in a 1942 article in reverse mathematics that explores which set-theoretic axioms are needed to develop analysis. (Note: "The foundation of analysis does not require the full generality of set theory but can be accomplished within a more restricted frame." Bernays, Paul (1942). "Part III. Infinity and enumerability. Analysis" (PDF). Journal of Symbolic Logic. A system of axiomatic set theory. 7 (2): 65–89. doi:10.2307/2266303. JSTOR 2266303. MR 0006333. S2CID 250344853. The axiom of dependent choice is stated on p. 86.)

== Formal statement ==
A homogeneous relation $R$ on $X$ is called a total relation if for every $a \in X,$ there exists some $b \in X$ such that $a\,R~b$.

The axiom of dependent choice can be stated as follows: For every nonempty set $X$ and every total relation $R$ on $X,$ there exists a sequence $(x_n)_{n \in \N}$ in $X$ such that

$x_n\, R~x_{n + 1}$ for all $n \in \N.$

In fact, $x_0$ may be taken to be any desired element of $X$. (To see this, apply the axiom as stated above to the set of finite sequences that start with $x_0$ and in which subsequent terms are in relation $R$, together with the total relation on this set of the second sequence being obtained from the first by appending a single term.)

If the set $X$ above is restricted to be the set of all real numbers, then the resulting axiom is denoted by $\mathsf{DC}_{\R}.$

== Use ==
Even without such an axiom, for any $n$, one can use ordinary mathematical induction to form the first $n$ terms of such a sequence. The axiom of dependent choice says that we can form a whole (countably infinite) sequence this way.

The axiom $\mathsf{DC}$ is the fragment of $\mathsf{AC}$ that is required to show the existence of a sequence constructed by transfinite recursion of countable length, if it is necessary to make a choice at each step and if some of those choices cannot be made independently of previous choices.

== Equivalent statements ==
Over $\mathsf{ZF}$ (Zermelo–Fraenkel set theory without the axiom of choice), $\mathsf{DC}$ is equivalent to the Baire category theorem for complete metric spaces.

It is also equivalent over $\mathsf{ZF}$ to the downward Löwenheim–Skolem theorem. (Note: Moore states that "Principle of Dependent Choices $\Rightarrow$ Löwenheim–Skolem theorem" — that is, $\mathsf{DC}$ implies the Löwenheim–Skolem theorem. See table Moore, Gregory H. (1982). Zermelo's Axiom of Choice: Its origins, development, and influence. Springer. p. 325. ISBN 0-387-90670-3.)

$\mathsf{DC}$ is also equivalent over $\mathsf{ZF}$ to the statement that every pruned tree with $\omega$ levels has a branch (proof below).

Furthermore, $\mathsf{DC}$ is equivalent to a weakened form of Zorn's lemma; specifically $\mathsf{DC}$ is equivalent to the statement that any partial order such that every well-ordered chain is finite and bounded, must have a maximal element.

Proof that $\,\mathsf{DC} \iff$ Every pruned tree with ω levels has a branch
$(\,\Longleftarrow\,)$ Let $R$ be an entire binary relation on $X$. The strategy is to define a tree $T$ on $X$ of finite sequences whose neighboring elements satisfy $R.$ Then a branch through $T$ is an infinite sequence whose neighboring elements satisfy $R.$ Start by defining $\langle x_0, \dots, x_n\rangle \in T$ if $x_k R\,x_{k+1}$ for $0 \le k < n.$ Since $R$ is entire, $T$ is a pruned tree with $\omega$ levels. Thus, $T$ has a branch $\langle x_0, \dots, x_n, \dots\rangle.$ So, for all $n \ge 0\!:$ $\langle x_0, \dots, x_n, x_{n+1}\rangle \in T,$ which implies $x_nR\,x_{n+1}.$ Therefore, $\mathsf{DC}$ is true.

$(\,\Longrightarrow\,)$ Let $T$ be a pruned tree on $X$ with $\omega$ levels. The strategy is to define a binary relation $R$ on $T$ so that $\mathsf{DC}$ produces a sequence $t_n = \langle x_0, \dots, x_{f(n)} \rangle$ where $t_nR\,t_{n+1}$ and $f(n)$ is a strictly increasing function. Then the infinite sequence $\langle x_0, \dots, x_k, \dots \rangle$ is a branch. (This proof only needs to prove this for $f(n) = m + n.$) Start by defining $u\,R\,v$ if $u$ is an initial subsequence of $v,\operatorname{length}(u) > 0,\,$ and $\operatorname{length}(v) =$ $\operatorname{length}(u) + 1.$ Since $T$ is a pruned tree with $\omega$ levels, $R$ is entire. Therefore, $\mathsf{DC}$ implies that there is an infinite sequence $t_n$ such that $t_n\,R\,t_{n+1}.$ Now $t_0 = \langle x_0, \dots, x_m \rangle$ for some $m \ge 0.$ Let $x_{m+n}$ be the last element of $t_n.$ Then $t_n = \langle x_0, \dots, x_m, \dots, x_{m+n} \rangle.$ For all $k \ge 0,$ the sequence $\langle x_0, \dots, x_k \rangle$ belongs to $T$ because it is an initial subsequence of $t_0\, (k \le m)$ or it is a $t_n\, (k \ge m).$ Therefore, $\langle x_0, \dots, x_k, \dots \rangle$ is a branch.

== Relation with other axioms ==
Unlike full $\mathsf{AC}$, $\mathsf{DC}$ is insufficient to prove (given $\mathsf{ZF}$) that there is a non-measurable set of real numbers, or that there is a set of real numbers without the property of Baire or without the perfect set property. This follows because the Solovay model satisfies $\mathsf{ZF} + \mathsf{DC}$, and every set of real numbers in this model is Lebesgue measurable, has the Baire property and has the perfect set property.

The axiom of dependent choice implies the axiom of countable choice and is strictly stronger.

It is possible to generalize the axiom to produce transfinite sequences. If these are allowed to be arbitrarily long, then it becomes equivalent to the full axiom of choice.
