= Finite character =

In mathematics, a family $\mathcal{F}$ of sets is of finite character if for each $A$, $A$ belongs to $\mathcal{F}$ if and only if every finite subset of $A$ belongs to $\mathcal{F}$. That is,

1. For each $A\in \mathcal{F}$, every finite subset of $A$ belongs to $\mathcal{F}$.
2. If every finite subset of a given set $A$ belongs to $\mathcal{F}$, then $A$ belongs to $\mathcal{F}$.

== Properties ==
A family $\mathcal{F}$ of sets of finite character enjoys the following properties:

1. For each $A\in \mathcal{F}$, every (finite or infinite) subset of $A$ belongs to $\mathcal{F}$.
2. If we take the axiom of choice to be true then every nonempty family of finite character has a maximal element with respect to inclusion (Tukey's lemma): In $\mathcal{F}$, partially ordered by inclusion, the union of every chain of elements of $\mathcal{F}$ also belongs to $\mathcal{F}$, therefore, by Zorn's lemma, $\mathcal{F}$ contains at least one maximal element.

== Example ==
Let $V$ be a vector space, and let $\mathcal{F}$ be the family of linearly independent subsets of $V$. Then $\mathcal{F}$ is a family of finite character (because a subset $X \subseteq V$ is linearly dependent if and only if $X$ has a finite subset which is linearly dependent). Therefore, in every vector space, there exists a maximal family of linearly independent elements. As a maximal family is a vector basis, every vector space has a (possibly infinite) vector basis.

== See also ==
- Hereditarily finite set
