= Hausdorff maximal principle =

Mathematical result or axiom on order relations

In mathematics, the Hausdorff maximal principle is an alternate and earlier formulation of Zorn's lemma proved by Felix Hausdorff in 1914. It states that in any partially ordered set, every totally ordered subset is contained in a maximal totally ordered subset, where "maximal" is with respect to set inclusion.

In a partially ordered set, a totally ordered subset is also called a chain. Thus, the maximal principle says every chain in the set extends to a maximal chain.

An immediate corollary is Zorn's Lemma, that if every chain of a poset has an upper bound then the poset contains a maximal element, namely the upper bound of a maximal chain.

The Hausdorff maximal principle is one of many statements equivalent to the axiom of choice over ZF (Zermelo–Fraenkel set theory without the axiom of choice). The principle is also called the Hausdorff maximality theorem or the Kuratowski lemma.

== Statement ==
The Hausdorff maximal principle states that, in any partially ordered set $P$, every chain $C_0$ (i.e., a totally ordered subset) is contained in a maximal chain $C$ (i.e., a chain that is not contained in a strictly larger chain in $P$). In general, there may be several maximal chains containing a given chain.

An equivalent form of the Hausdorff maximal principle is that in every partially ordered set, there exists a maximal chain. (Note if the set is empty, the empty subset is a maximal chain.)

This form follows from the original form since the empty set is a chain. Conversely, to deduce the original form from this form, consider the set $P'$ of all chains in $P$ containing a given chain $C_0$ in $P$. Then $P'$ is partially ordered by set inclusion. Thus, by the maximal principle in the above form, $P'$ contains a maximal chain $C'$. Let $C$ be the union of $C'$, which is a chain in $P$ since a union of a totally ordered set of chains is a chain. Since $C$ contains $C_0$, it is an element of $P'$. Also, since any chain containing $C_0$ is contained in $C$ as $C$ is a union, $C$ is in fact a maximal element of $P'$; i.e., a maximal chain in $P$.

The proof that the Hausdorff maximal principle is equivalent to Zorn's lemma is somehow similar to this proof. Indeed, first assume Zorn's lemma. Since a union of a totally ordered set of chains is a chain, the hypothesis of Zorn's lemma (every chain has an upper bound) is satisfied for $P'$ and thus $P'$ contains a maximal element or a maximal chain in $P$.

Conversely, if the maximal principle holds, then $P$ contains a maximal chain $C$. By the hypothesis of Zorn's lemma, $C$ has an upper bound $x$ in $P$. If $y \ge x$, then $\widetilde{C} = C \cup \{ y \}$ is a chain containing $C$ and so by maximality, $\widetilde{C} = C$; i.e., $y \in C$ and so $y = x$. $\square$

== Examples ==
If A is any collection of sets, the relation "is a proper subset of" is a strict partial order on A. Suppose that A is the collection of all circular regions (interiors of circles) in the plane. One maximal totally ordered sub-collection of A consists of all circular regions with centers at the origin. Another maximal totally ordered sub-collection consists of all circular regions bounded by circles tangent from the right to the y-axis at the origin.

If (x_{0}, y_{0}) and (x_{1}, y_{1}) are two points of the plane $\mathbb{R}^{2}$, define (x_{0}, y_{0}) < (x_{1}, y_{1}) if y_{0} = y_{1} and x_{0} < x_{1}. This is a partial ordering of $\mathbb{R}^{2}$ under which two points are comparable only if they lie on the same horizontal line. The maximal totally ordered sets are horizontal lines in $\mathbb{R}^{2}$.

== Application ==
By the Hausdorff maximal principle, we can show every Hilbert space $H$ contains a maximal orthonormal subset $A$ as follows. (This fact can be stated as saying that $H \simeq \ell^2(A)$ as Hilbert spaces.)

Let $P$ be the set of all orthonormal subsets of the given Hilbert space $H$, which is partially ordered by set inclusion. It is nonempty as it contains the empty set and thus by the maximal principle, it contains a maximal chain $Q$. Let $A$ be the union of $Q$. We shall show it is a maximal orthonormal subset. First, if $S, T$ are in $Q$, then either $S \subset T$ or $T \subset S$. That is, any given two distinct elements in $A$ are contained in some $S$ in $Q$ and so they are orthogonal to each other (and of course, $A$ is a subset of the unit sphere in $H$). Second, if $B \supsetneq A$ for some $B$ in $P$, then $B$ cannot be in $Q$ and so $Q \cup \{ B \}$ is a chain strictly larger than $Q$, a contradiction. $\square$

For the purpose of comparison, here is a proof of the same fact by Zorn's lemma. As above, let $P$ be the set of all orthonormal subsets of $H$. If $Q$ is a chain in $P$, then the union of $Q$ is also orthonormal by the same argument as above and so is an upper bound of $Q$. Thus, by Zorn's lemma, $P$ contains a maximal element $A$. (So, the difference is that the maximal principle gives a maximal chain while Zorn's lemma gives a maximal element directly.)

== Proofs ==
=== Proof 1 ===
The idea of the proof is essentially due to Zermelo and is to prove the following weak form of Zorn's lemma, from the axiom of choice.

Lemma—Let $F$ be a set consisting of subsets of some fixed set $P$ such that $F$ satisfies the following properties:

1. $F$ is nonempty.
2. The union of each totally ordered subset of $F$ is in $F$, where the ordering is with respect to set inclusion.
3. For each set $S$ in $F$, each subset of $S$ is in $F$.

Then $F$ has a maximal element with respect to set inclusion.

(Zorn's lemma itself also follows from this weak form.) The maximal principle follows from the above since the set of all chains in $P$ satisfies the above conditions.

By the axiom of choice, we have a function $f : \mathfrak{P}(P) - \{ \emptyset \} \to P$ such that $f(S) \in S$ for the power set $\mathfrak{P}(P)$ of $P$.

For each $C \in F$, let $C^*$ be the set of all $x \in P - C$ such that $C \cup \{ x \}$ is in $F$. If $C^* = \emptyset$, then let $\widetilde{C} = C$. Otherwise, let

$$\widetilde{C} = C \cup \{ f(C^*) \}.$$

Note $C$ is a maximal element if and only if $\widetilde{C} = C$. Thus, we are done if we can find a $C$ such that $\widetilde{C} = C$.

Fix a $C_0$ in $F$. We call a subset $T \subset F$ a tower (over $C_0$) if

1. $C_0$ is in $T$.
2. The union of each totally ordered subset $T' \subset T$ is in $T$, where "totally ordered" is with respect to set inclusion.
3. For each $C$ in $T$, $\widetilde{C}$ is in $T$.

There exists at least one tower; indeed, $F$ itself is a tower. Let $T_0$ be the intersection of all towers, which is again a tower.

Now, we shall show $T_0$ is totally ordered. We say a set $C$ is comparable in $T_0$ if for each $A$ in $T_0$, either $A \subset C$ or $C \subset A$. Let $\Gamma$ be the set of all sets in $T_0$ that are comparable in $T_0$. We claim $\Gamma$ is a tower. The conditions 1. and 2. are straightforward to check. For 3., let $C$ in $\Gamma$ be given and then let $U$ be the set of all $A$ in $T_0$ such that either $A \subset C$ or $\widetilde{C} \subset A$.

We claim $U$ is a tower. The conditions 1. and 2. are again straightforward to check. For 3., let $A$ be in $U$. If $A \subset C$, then since $C$ is comparable in $T_0$, either $\widetilde{A} \subset C$ or $C \subset \widetilde{A}$. In the first case, $\widetilde{A}$ is in $U$. In the second case, we have $A \subset C \subset \widetilde{A}$, which implies either $A = C$ or $C = \widetilde{A}$. (This is the moment we needed to collapse a set to an element by the axiom of choice to define $\widetilde{A}$.) Either way, we have $\widetilde{A}$ is in $U$. Similarly, if $C \subset A$, we see $\widetilde{A}$ is in $U$. Hence, $U$ is a tower. Now, since $U \subset T_0$ and $T_0$ is the intersection of all towers, $U = T_0$, which implies $\widetilde{C}$ is comparable in $T_0$; i.e., is in $\Gamma$. This completes the proof of the claim that $\Gamma$ is a tower.

Finally, since $\Gamma$ is a tower contained in $T_0$, we have $T_0 = \Gamma$, which means $T_0$ is totally ordered.

Let $C$ be the union of $T_0$. By 2., $C$ is in $T_0$ and then by 3., $\widetilde C$ is in $T_0$. Since $C$ is the union of $T_0$, $\widetilde C \subset C$ and thus $\widetilde C = C$. $\square$

The existence of a $C$ in $F$ such that $\widetilde{C} = C$ is also immediately given by the Bourbaki–Witt theorem (cf. § Proof 2), which says that $F \to F, \, C \mapsto \widetilde{C}$ has a fixed point. On the other hand, the above proof actually establishes the following as a special case, which is somewhat of independent interest.

Lemma—Let $P$ be a poset and $F$ the set of all chains in $P$. Then there does not exist a function $g : F \to P$ such that, for each $C \in F$, $g(C)$ is a strict upper bound of $C$.

Indeed, if such $g$ exists, we define $\widetilde{C} = C \cup \{ g(C) \}$ and the above $C$ gives a contradiction as $C = \widetilde{C}$. This lemma in turns immediately implies the Bourbaki–Witt theorem; see Bourbaki–Witt theorem#Proof 3.

For an alternative proof (of Bourbaki–Witt), see also the proof of Theorem 3.1. (Bourbaki-Witt) at Zorn's lemma What we call a tower here is the same as an s-inductive set there. That proof is exactly the same as the proof of Zorn's lemma in Lang's Algebra.

=== Proof 2 ===
The Bourbaki–Witt theorem states

Let $X$ be a nonempty poset in which each chain has a least upper bound (i,e., supremum). Then each function $f : X \to X$ such that $f(x) \ge x$ for every $x$ in $X$ has a fixed point.

The above theorem itself does not rely on the axiom of choice. However, together with the axiom of choice, it can be used to prove the Hausdorff maximal principle as follows. Take $X$ to be the set of all chains in a poset $P$, which itself is a poset with respect to set inclusion. It is nonempty since it includes the empty set. Also, the union of a chain $\mathcal{C} \subset X$ is a least upper bound: it is clearly an upper bound and if $U$ is an upper bound of $\mathcal{C}$, then $\cup \mathcal{C} \subset U$. Now, for each chain $C$ in $P$, let $C^*$ be the set of all strict upper bounds of $C$. Let

$$g : \mathfrak{P}(P) - \{ \emptyset \} \to P$$

be a choice function whose existence is ensured by the axiom of choice and then define $f : X \to X$ by

$$f(C)\mathrel{\mathop:}=\begin{cases}C, &\text{if}\ C\ \text{is maximal}\\ C\cup \{g(C^*)\}, &\text{if}\ C\ \text{is not maximal}\end{cases}$$

By the Bourbaki-Witt theorem, there exists an element $C$ in $X$ such that $f(C) = C$ and this $C$ is a maximal chain in $P$. $\square$

=== Proof from the well-ordering theorem ===
Let $P'$ be the set of all chains in $P$. By the well-ordering theorem, we find a well-ordering $\preceq$ on $P$. We shall construct the function

$$f : P \to P'$$

recursively with respect to $\preceq$ as follows. For an element $x$ in $P$, suppose we are given an arbitrary function

$$g : \{ y \in P \mid y \prec x \} \to P'.$$

Then let

$$f(x) = (\cup \operatorname{im}(g)) \cup \{ x \}$$

if the set on the right is totally ordered; i.e., an element of $P'$ and $f(x) = \emptyset$ otherwise. If $g$ itself is also required to satisfy the above recursive condition, then the transfinite recursion theorem ensures this defines the function $f$ uniquely (in a nutshell, if $x$ is a $\preceq$-least element, the domain of $g$ above is the empty set and thus $f(x)$ is uniquely determined and in general, the recursion condition ensures the unique $g$ is used to define $f(x)$.) We note

1. The image of $f$ is totally ordered, with respect to set inclusion.
2. If $D$ is a chain containing $\cup \{ f(y) \mid y \prec x, \, x \in D \}$, then $x \in f(x)$ for each $x \in D$.

Indeed, (1) holds since if $y \prec x$, then

$$f(x) = (\cup \{ f(y) \mid y \prec x \}) \cup \{ x \}$$

which contains $f(y)$ as a subset. (2) holds since

$$f(\{ y \mid y \prec x \}) \cup \{ x \} \subset D$$

is a chain as it is a subset of a chain.

Finally, by (1), the union $C$ of the image of $f$ is a chain and it is maximal by (2), since if $D \supset C$ is another chain, then $x \in f(x)\subset C$ for each $x \in D$. $\square$
