= Pataraia's theorem =

In mathematics, Pataraia's theorem states each monotone map $f : P \to P$ for an inductive poset $P$ admits a least fixed point, where an inductive poset means a dcpo with a least element. It was introduced by Dito Pataraia in 1997. The theorem is a variant of the Bourbaki–Witt theorem.

== See also ==
- Markowsky's theorem

== Sources ==
- Paul Taylor, A Fixed Point Theorem for Categories
- Jean Goubault-Larrecq, Bourbaki, Witt, and Dito Pataraia,
- Andrej Bauer, Peter LeFanu Lumsdaine, On the Bourbaki-Witt Principle in Toposes, Math. Proc. Cam. Phil. Soc. 155 (2013), no. 1, 87–99 doi:10.1017/S0305004113000108, arXiv:1201.0340.
- Escardo, Martin (2003). "Joins in the frame of nuclei". Applied Categorical Structures. 11: 117–124. doi:10.1023/A:1023555514029.
- Escardo, Martin (26 February 2024). "Pataraia".
