= Well-ordering theorem =

Theorem that every set can be well-ordered

In mathematics, the well-ordering theorem, also known as Zermelo's theorem, states that every set can be well-ordered. A set X is well-ordered by a strict total order if every non-empty subset of X has a least element under the ordering. The well-ordering theorem together with Zorn's lemma are the most important mathematical statements that are equivalent to the axiom of choice (often called AC, see also Axiom of choice § Equivalents). Ernst Zermelo introduced the axiom of choice as an "unobjectionable logical principle" to prove the well-ordering theorem. One can conclude from the well-ordering theorem that every set is susceptible to transfinite induction, which is considered by mathematicians to be a powerful technique.

== History ==
Georg Cantor considered the well-ordering theorem to be a "fundamental principle of thought". However, it is considered difficult or even impossible to visualize a well-ordering of $\mathbb{R}$, the set of all real numbers; such a visualization would have to incorporate the axiom of choice. In 1904, Gyula Kőnig claimed to have proven that such a well-ordering cannot exist. A few weeks later, Felix Hausdorff found a mistake in the proof. It turned out, though, that in first-order logic the well-ordering theorem is equivalent to the axiom of choice, in the sense that the Zermelo–Fraenkel axioms with the axiom of choice included are sufficient to prove the well-ordering theorem, and conversely, the Zermelo–Fraenkel axioms without the axiom of choice but with the well-ordering theorem included are sufficient to prove the axiom of choice. (The same applies to Zorn's lemma.) In second-order logic, however, the well-ordering theorem is strictly stronger than the axiom of choice: from the well-ordering theorem one may deduce the axiom of choice, but from the axiom of choice one cannot deduce the well-ordering theorem.

There is a well-known joke about the three statements, and their relative amenability to intuition:

The axiom of choice is obviously true, the well-ordering principle obviously false, and who can tell about Zorn's lemma?

== Proof from axiom of choice ==
The well-ordering theorem follows from the axiom of choice as follows.

Let the set we are trying to well-order be $A$, and let $f$ be a choice function for the family of non-empty subsets of $A$. For every ordinal $\alpha$, define by transfinite recursion an element $a_\alpha$ that is in $A$ by setting $a_\alpha\ =\ f(A\setminus\{a_\xi\mid\xi<\alpha\})$ if this complement $A\setminus\{a_\xi\mid\xi<\alpha\}$ is nonempty, or leaves $a_\alpha$ undefined if the complement is empty. That is, $a_\alpha$ is chosen from the set of elements of $A$ that have not yet been assigned a place in the ordering (or undefined if the entirety of $A$ has been successfully enumerated). Then the order $<$ on $A$ defined by $a_\alpha < a_\beta$ if and only if $\alpha<\beta$ (in the usual well-order of the ordinals) is a well-order of $A$ as desired, of order type $\{\alpha \mid a_\alpha\text{ is defined}\}$ (in the von Neumann representation).

== Proof of axiom of choice ==
The axiom of choice can be proven from the well-ordering theorem as follows.

To make a choice function for a collection of non-empty sets, $E$, take the union of the sets in $E$ and call it $X$. There exists a well-ordering of $X$; let $R$ be such an ordering. The function that to each set $S$ of $E$ associates the smallest element of $S$, as ordered by (the restriction to $S$ of) $R$, is a choice function for the collection $E$.

An essential point of this proof is that it involves only a single arbitrary choice, that of $R$; applying the well-ordering theorem to each member $S$ of $E$ separately would not work, since the theorem only asserts the existence of a well-ordering, and choosing for each $S$ a well-ordering would require just as many choices as simply choosing an element from each $S$.
