= Association for Symbolic Logic =

International specialist organization

- Abbreviation: ASL
- Formation: 1936
- Type: Scholarly society
- Purpose: Research, Inquiry
- Headquarters: Storrs, Connecticut
- President: Natasha Dobrinen
- Website: aslonline.org

The Association for Symbolic Logic (ASL) is an international organization of specialists in mathematical logic and philosophical logic. The ASL was founded in 1936, and its first president was Curt John Ducasse. The current president of the ASL is Natasha Dobrinen.

== Publications ==
The ASL publishes books and academic journals. Its three official journals are:

- Journal of Symbolic Logic – publishes research in all areas of mathematical logic. Founded in 1936, ISSN 0022-4812.
- Bulletin of Symbolic Logic – publishes primarily expository articles and reviews. Founded in 1995, ISSN 1079-8986. (Cambridge Core)
- Review of Symbolic Logic – publishes research relating to logic, philosophy, science, and their interactions. Founded in 2008, ISSN 1755-0203.

In addition, the ASL has a sponsored journal:

- Journal of Logic and Analysis publishes research on the interactions between mathematical logic and pure and applied analysis. Founded in 2009 as an open-access successor to the Springer journal Logic and Analysis. ISSN 1759-9008.

The organization played a part in publishing the collected writings of Kurt Gödel.

=== Books series ===
Lectures Notes in Logic

Perspectives in Logic

=== Books ===
Mathematical Logic by Joseph R. Shoenfield

== Gödel Lecture Series ==
The Gödel Lecture Series is series of annual ASL lectures that trace back to 1990.

The Thirty-Fifth Gödel Lecture 2024

Thomas Scanlon, (Un)decidability in fields

The Thirty-Fourth Gödel Lecture 2023

Carl Jockusch, From algorithms which succeed on a large set of inputs to the Turing degrees as a metric space

The Thirty-Third Gödel Lecture 2022

Patricia Blanchette, Formalism in Logic

The Thirty-Second Gödel Lecture 2021

Matthew Foreman, Gödel Diffeomorphisms

The Thirty-First Gödel Lecture 2020

Elisabeth Bouscaren, The ubiquity of configurations in Model Theory

The Thirtieth Gödel Lecture 2019

Sam Buss, Totality, Provability and Feasibility

The Twenty-Ninth Annual Gödel Lecture 2018

Rod Downey, Algorithmic randomness

The Twenty-Eighth Annual Gödel Lecture 2017

Charles Parsons, Gödel and the universe of sets

The Twenty-Seventh Annual Gödel Lecture 2016

Stevo Todorcevic, Basis problems in set theory

The Twenty-Sixth Annual Gödel Lecture 2015

Alex Wilkie, Complex continuations of functions definable in $\mathbb{R}_{an, exp}$ with a diophantine application

The Twenty-Fifth Annual Gödel Lecture 2014

Julia F. Knight, Computable structure theory and formulas of special forms

The Twenty-Fourth Annual Gödel Lecture 2013

Kit Fine, Truthmaker semantics

The Twenty-Third Annual Gödel Lecture 2012

John Steel, The hereditarily ordinal definable sets in models of determinacy

The Twenty-Second Annual Gödel Lecture 2011

Anand Pillay, First order theories

The Twenty-First Annual Gödel Lecture 2010

Alexander Razborov, Complexity of propositional proofs

The Twentieth Annual Gödel Lecture 2009

Richard Shore, Reverse Mathematics: the Playground of Logic

The Nineteenth Annual Gödel Lecture 2008

W. Hugh Woodin, The Continuum Hypothesis, the Ω Conjecture, and the inner model problem of one supercompact cardinal

The Eighteenth Annual Gödel Lecture 2007

Ehud Hrushovski (a lecture on his work delivered in his absence by Thomas Scanlon)

The Seventeenth Annual Gödel Lecture 2006

Per Martin-Löf, The two layers of logic

The Sixteenth Annual Gödel Lecture 2005

Menachem Magidor, Skolem-Lowenheim theorems for generalized logics

The Fifteenth Annual Gödel Lecture 2004

Michael O. Rabin, Proofs persuasions and randomness in mathematics

The Fourteenth Annual Gödel Lecture 2003

Boris Zilber, Categoricity

The Thirteenth Annual Gödel Lecture 2002

Harvey Friedman, Issues in the foundations of mathematics

The Twelfth Annual Gödel Lecture 2001

Theodore A. Slaman, Recursion Theory

The Eleventh Annual Gödel Lecture 2000

Jon Barwise (Cancelled due to death of speaker)

The Tenth Annual Gödel Lecture 1999

Stephen A. Cook, Logic and computatonal complexity

The Ninth Annual Gödel Lecture 1998

Alexander S. Kechris, Current Trends in Descriptive Set Theory

The Eighth Annual Gödel Lecture 1997

1997 Solomon Feferman, Occupations and Preoccupations with Gödel: His*Works* and the Work

The Seventh Annual Gödel Lecture 1996

1996 Saharon Shelah, Categoricity without compactness

The Sixth Annual Gödel Lecture 1995

1995 Leo Harrington, Goedel, Heidegger, and Direct Perception (or, Why I am a Recursion Theorist)

The Fifth Annual Gödel Lecture 1994

1994 Donald A. Martin, L(R): A Survey

The Fourth Annual Gödel Lecture 1993

1993 Angus Macintyre, Logic of Real and p-adic Analysis: Achievements and Challenges

The Third Annual Gödel Lecture 1992

1992 Joseph R. Shoenfield, The Priority Method

The Second Annual Gödel Lecture 1991

1991 Dana Scott, Will Logicians be Replaced by Machines?

The First Annual Gödel Lecture 1990

1990 Ronald Jensen, Inner Models and Large Cardinals

== Meetings ==
The ASL holds two main meetings every year, one in North America and one in Europe (the latter known as the Logic Colloquium). In addition, the ASL regularly holds joint meetings with both the American Mathematical Society ("AMS") and the American Philosophical Association ("APA"), and sponsors meetings in many different countries every year.

== List of presidents ==
	Name	Term of office
1st President	Curt John Ducasse	1936–1937
2nd President	Haskell Curry	1938–1940
3rd President	Cooper Harold Langford	1941–1943
4th President	Alfred Tarski	1944–1946
5th President	Ernest Nagel	1947–1949
6th President	J. Barkley Rosser	1950–1952
7th President	Willard Van Orman Quine	1953–1955
8th President	Stephen Cole Kleene	1956–1958
9th President	Frederic Fitch	1959–1961
10th President	Leon Henkin	1962–1964
11th President	William Craig	1965–1967
12th President	Abraham Robinson	1968–1970
13th President	Dana Scott	1971–1973
14th President	Joseph R. Shoenfield	1974–1976
15th President	Hilary Putnam	1977–1979
16th President	Solomon Feferman	1980–1982
17th President	Ruth Barcan Marcus	1983–1985
18th President	Michael Morley	1986–1988
19th President	Charles Parsons	1989–1991
20th President	Yiannis Moschovakis	1992–1994
21st President	George Boolos	1995–1996
22nd President	Menachem Magidor	1996–1997
23rd President	Donald A. Martin	1998–2000
24th President	Richard Shore	2001–2003
25th President	Alexander Kechris	2004–2006
26th President	Penelope Maddy	2007–2009
27th President	Alex Wilkie	2010–2012
28th President	Alasdair Urquhart	2013–2015
29th President	Ulrich Kohlenbach	2016–2018
30th President	Julia Knight	2019–2021
31st President	Phokion Kolaitis	2022–2024
32nd President	Natasha Dobrinen	2025–2028

== Awards ==
The association periodically presents a number of prizes and awards.

=== Karp Prize ===
The Karp Prize is awarded by the association every five years for an outstanding paper or book in the field of symbolic logic. It consists of a cash award and was established in 1973 in memory of Professor Carol Karp.

Year	Recipient(s)
1978	Robert Vaught, University of California, Berkeley
1983	Saharon Shelah, Hebrew University
1988	Donald A. Martin, UCLA; John R. Steel, UCLA; W. Hugh Woodin, University of California, Berkeley
1993	Ehud Hrushovski, MIT and Alex Wilkie, Oxford
1998	Ehud Hrushovski, Hebrew University
2003	Gregory Hjorth, UCLA and Alexander Kechris, Caltech
2008	Zlil Sela, Hebrew University
2013	Moti Gitik, Tel Aviv University; Ya'acov Peterzil, University of Haifa; Jonathan Pila, University of Oxford; Sergei Starchenko, University of Notre Dame; Alex Wilkie, University of Manchester
2018	Matthias Aschenbrenner, UCLA; Lou van den Dries, University of Illinois at Urbana–Champaign; Joris van der Hoeven, École Polytechnique
2023	John Steel, University of California, Berkeley

=== Sacks Prize ===
The Sacks Prize is awarded for the most outstanding doctoral dissertation in mathematical logic. It consists of a cash award and was established in 1999 to honor Professor Gerald Sacks of MIT and Harvard.

Recipients include:

Year	Recipient(s)
1994	Gregory Hjorth
1995	Slawomir Solecki
1996	Byunghan Kim
1997	Ilijas Farah and Thomas Scanlon
1998	no prize awarded
1999	Denis Hirschfeldt and Rene Schipperus
2000	Eric Jaligot
2001	Matthias Aschenbrenner
2002	no prize awarded
2003	Itay Ben Yaacov
2004	Joseph Mileti and Nathan Segerlind
2005	Antonio Montalbán
2006	Matteo Viale
2007	Adrien Deloro and Wojciech Moczydlowski
2008	Inessa Epstein and Dilip Raghavan
2009	Isaac Goldbring and Grigor Sargsyan
2010	Uri Andrews
2011	Mingzhong Cai and Adam Day
2012	Pierre Simon
2013	Artem Chernikov and Nathanaël Mariaule
2014	no prize awarded
2015	Omer Ben-Neria and Martino Lupini
2016	William Johnson and Ludovic Patey
2017	Matthew Harrison-Trainor and Sebastien Vasey
2018	Danny Nguyen
2019	Gabriel Goldberg
2020	James Walsh
2021	Marcos Mazari Armida
2022	Francesco Gallinaro and Patrick Lutz
2023	Andreas Lietz and Scott Mutchnik
2024	Nicholas Pischke and Erfan Khaniki

=== Shoenfield Prize ===
Inaugurated in 2007, the Shoenfield Prize is awarded every three years in two categories, book and article, recognizing outstanding expository writing in the field of logic and honoring the name of Joseph R. Shoenfield.

Recipients include:

Year	Recipient(s)
2007	John P. Burgess (book); Bohuslav Balcar and Thomas Jech (article)
2010	John T. Baldwin (book); Rod Downey, Denis Hirschfeldt, André Nies, and Sebastiaan Terwijn (article)
2013	Stevo Todorcevic (book); Itaï Ben Yaacov, Alexander Berenstein, C. Ward Henson, and Alexander Usvyatsov (article)
2016	Rod Downey and Denis Hirschfeldt (book); Lou van den Dries (article)
2019	Pierre Simon (book); John Steel (article)
2022	Paolo Mancosu, Sergio Galvan, and Richard Zach (book); Vasco Brattka (article)
