= Silver cardinal =

Silver cardinal is the virtual version of an inconsistent notion of what a Silver indiscernible would be if zero sharp "exists". If κ is the cardinal, then it says that there is (in a forcing extension of V) a club of ordinals in V_{κ} of order type κ which are indiscernible. That is, there are elementary embeddings between each pair of distinct indiscernibles.

Limits of Silver ordinals are also Silver. The forcing extension does not add ordinals below or above existing ordinals.

Let an ordinal, κ, be called α-Silver, if it is Silver and for every β < α the set of β-Silver ordinals below it has order type κ. Which particular ordinals are Silver and α-Silver cannot be determined in L itself, but if Ord is the least Silver ordinal strictly greater than some ordinal, then they can be identified in a V only slightly larger than L (that is, having the same initial ordinals). In this case, the set of Silver ordinals is countable and no 1-Silver ordinals exist.

Let us call the indiscernible ordinals in the club proto-Silver. If μ_{0} is the least proto-Silver ordinal and μ_{n+1} is the μ_{n}-th proto-Silver ordinal, then the least Silver cardinal is the limit of μ_{n} as n goes to ω. Since all Silver ordinals are proto-Silver and all proto-Silver are indiscernible, all of them must have cofinality ω in the forcing extension. Thus the proto-Silver ordinals all have cofinality ω in the forcing extension, even though they may have different cofinalities in V (reality). But which ordinals are proto-Silver maybe unknown in V.

If β has cofinality 1 or ω and α is any ordinal, then the least β-Silver cardinal strictly greater than α has cofinality ω in V. All Silver cardinals are regular ordinals in L.

== Strength relative to other large cardinals ==
Silver cardinal is stronger than any other large cardinals consistent with V=L including: the least Mahlo cardinal, the least weakly compact cardinal, the least unfoldable cardinal, the least ineffable cardinal, the least remarkable cardinal, the least virtually extendible cardinal, the least ω-iterable cardinal, the least virtually rank-into-rank cardinal, the least ω-Erdős cardinal, and the least λ-iterable cardinal, and the least λ-Erdős cardinal (for ω+1≤λ<ω_{1}).

But Silver cardinal is weaker than zero sharp, ω_{1}-iterable cardinal, ω_{1}-Erdos cardinal, Ramsey cardinal, and measurable cardinal. If zero sharp exists, then all stronger large cardinals (and indeed all uncountable initial ordinals of cardinals) are Silver L-indiscernibles and thus Silver cardinals. Zero sharp "exists" is equivalent to the existence of a ω_{1}-Silver cardinal, and the least ω_{1}-Silver cardinal would be ω_{1} itself.

== Forcing ==
One possible way of doing the forcing would be to force an uncountable regular ordinal to be countable. Suppose λ is regular in V and λ > ω. Let the forcing conditions be finite subsets of ω×λ which are partial injective functions from ω to λ. Condition p is stronger than q iff q is a subset of p. Once we have the generic bijection from ω onto λ, λ^{+} the successor cardinal of λ in V would become ω_{1} of the forcing extension. Let an ordinal β be proto-Silver (relative to κ) iff β < κ and there is in V_{λ+1} of the forcing extension an elementary embedding j from V_{λ} of the forcing extension to itself with critical point β and j(β) = κ < λ. Then κ is Silver iff κ is the order type of the set of proto-Silver ordinals below κ. That is, κ is a fixed point of an enumeration of the proto-Silver ordinals.

Each proto-Silver ordinal is a virtually rank-into-rank cardinal and κ is also a limit of virtually rank-into-rank cardinals.

== See also ==
- Indiscernible
- List of large cardinal properties
