= Gödel Lecture =

Award in mathematical logic

The Gödel Lecture is an honor in mathematical logic given by the Association for Symbolic Logic, associated with an annual lecture at the association's general meeting. The award is named after Kurt Gödel and has been given annually since 1990.

== Award winners ==
The list of award winners and lecture titles is maintained online by the Association for Symbolic Logic.

- 1990 Ronald Jensen, Inner Models and Large Cardinals.
- 1991 Dana Scott, Will Logicians be Replaced by Machines?
- 1992 Joseph R. Shoenfield, The Priority Method.
- 1993 Angus Macintyre, Logic of Real and p-adic Analysis: Achievements and Challenges.
- 1994 Donald A. Martin, L(R): A Survey.
- 1995 Leo Harrington, Gödel, Heidegger, and Direct Perception (or, Why I am a Recursion Theorist).
- 1996 Saharon Shelah, Categoricity without compactness.
- 1997 Solomon Feferman, Occupations and Preoccupations with Gödel: His *Works* and the Work.
- 1998 Alexander S. Kechris, Current Trends in Descriptive Set Theory.
- 1999 Stephen Cook, Logic and computational complexity.
- 2000 Jon Barwise — cancelled due to the death of the speaker.
- 2001 Theodore Slaman, Recursion Theory.
- 2002 Harvey Friedman, Issues in the foundations of mathematics.
- 2003 Boris Zilber, Categoricity.
- 2004 Michael O. Rabin, Proofs persuasions and randomness in mathematics.
- 2005 Menachem Magidor, Skolem-Lowenheim theorems for generalized logics.
- 2006 Per Martin-Löf, The two layers of logic.
- 2007 Ehud Hrushovski — a lecture on his work titled Algebraic Model Theory was given by Thomas W. Scanlon in his absence.
- 2008 W. Hugh Woodin, The Continuum Hypothesis, the $\Omega$ Conjecture, and the inner model problem of one supercompact cardinal.
- 2009 Richard Shore, Reverse Mathematics: the Playground of Logic.
- 2010 Alexander Razborov, Complexity of Propositional Proofs.
- 2011 Anand Pillay, First order theories.
- 2012 John R. Steel, The hereditarily ordinal definable sets in models of determinacy.
- 2013 Kit Fine, Truthmaker semantics.
- 2014 Julia F. Knight, Computable structure theory and formulas of special forms.
- 2015 Alex Wilkie, Complex continuations of functions definable in $\mathbb{R}_{an, exp}$ with a diophantine application.
- 2016 Stevo Todorčević, Basis problems in set theory.
- 2017 Charles Parsons, Gödel and the universe of sets.
- 2018 Rod Downey, Algorithmic randomness.
- 2019 Samuel Buss, Totality, provability and feasibility.
- 2020 Élisabeth Bouscaren, The ubiquity of configurations in Model Theory.
- 2021 Matthew Foreman, Gödel Diffeomorphisms.
- 2022 Patricia Blanchette, Formalism in Logic.
- 2023 Carl Jockusch, From algorithms which succeed on a large set of inputs to the Turing degrees as a metric space.
- 2024 Thomas W. Scanlon, (Un)decidability in fields.
- 2025 Joan Bagaria, "New challenges to our conception of the Higher Infinite."
- 2026 John P. Burgess, "Logical and mathematical conventionalism."

== See also ==
- List of logicians
- List of mathematics awards
- List of philosophy awards
- Karp Prize
- Tarski Lectures
