= Richard Shore =

American mathematician (born 1946)

Richard A. Shore
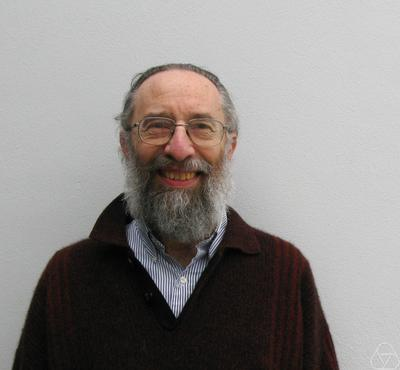
- Born: August 18, 1946 (age 80)
- Citizenship: American
- Education: MIT
- Scientific career
- Fields: Mathematics
- Workplaces: Cornell University
- Thesis: Priority Arguments in Alpha-Recursion Theory (1972)
- Doctoral advisor: Gerald E. Sacks

Richard Arnold Shore (born August 18, 1946) is a professor of mathematics at Cornell University who works in recursion theory. He is particularly known for his work on $\mathcal{D}$, the partial order of the Turing degrees.

- Shore settled the Rogers homogeneity conjecture by showing that there are Turing degrees $a$ and $b$ such that $\mathcal{D}_a$ and $\mathcal{D}_b$, the structures of the degrees above $a$ and $b$ respectively, are not isomorphic.
- In joint work with Theodore Slaman, Shore showed that the Turing jump is definable in $\mathcal{D}$.

== Career ==
He was, in 1983, an invited speaker at the International Congress of Mathematicians in Warsaw and gave a talk The Degrees of Unsolvability: the Ordering of Functions by Relative Computability. In 2009, he was the Gödel Lecturer (Reverse mathematics: the playground of logic). He was an editor from 1984 to 1993 of the Journal of Symbolic Logic and from 1993 to 2000 of the Bulletin of Symbolic Logic. In 2012, he became a fellow of the American Mathematical Society.
