= Jensen's covering theorem =

In set theory, Jensen's covering theorem states that if 0^{#} does not exist then every uncountable set of ordinals is contained in a constructible set of the same cardinality. Informally this conclusion says that the constructible universe is close to the universe of all sets. The first proof appeared in (Devlin & Jensen 1975). Silver later gave a fine-structure-free proof using his machines and finally Magidor (1990) gave an even simpler proof.

The converse of Jensen's covering theorem is also true: if 0^{#} exists then the countable set of all cardinals less than $\aleph_\omega$ cannot be covered by a constructible set of cardinality less than $\aleph_\omega$.

In his book Proper Forcing, Shelah proved a strong form of Jensen's covering lemma.

Hugh Woodin states it as:

Theorem 3.33 (Jensen). One of the following holds.

(1) Suppose λ is a singular cardinal. Then λ is singular in L and its successor cardinal is its successor cardinal in L.
(2) Every uncountable cardinal is inaccessible in L.
