= Jensen's theorem =

In mathematics, Jensen's theorem may refer to:

- Johan Jensen's inequality for convex functions
- Johan Jensen's formula in complex analysis
- Ronald Jensen's covering theorem in set theory
