= Annals of Pure and Applied Logic =

The Annals of Pure and Applied Logic is a peer-reviewed scientific journal published by Elsevier that publishes papers on applications of mathematical logic in mathematics, in computer science, and in other related disciplines. Until 1983, it was known as the Annals of Mathematical Logic.

The editors of Annals of Pure and Applied Logic include mathematicians Ulrich Kohlenbach at TU Darmstadt in Germany, Thomas W. Scanlon at the University of California, Berkeley, and Philip Scott at the University of Ottawa.
