= Zariski geometry =

Concept in mathematics

In mathematics, a Zariski geometry consists of an abstract structure introduced by Ehud Hrushovski and Boris Zilber, in order to give a characterisation of the Zariski topology on an algebraic curve, and all its powers. The Zariski topology on a product of algebraic varieties is very rarely the product topology, but richer in closed sets defined by equations that mix two sets of variables. The result described gives that a very definite meaning, applying to projective curves and compact Riemann surfaces in particular.

== Definition ==
A Zariski geometry consists of a set X and a topological structure on each of the sets

X, X^{2}, X^{3}, ...

satisfying certain axioms.

(N) Each of the X^{n} is a Noetherian topological space, of dimension at most n.

Some standard terminology for Noetherian spaces will now be assumed.

(A) In each X^{n}, the subsets defined by equality in an n-tuple are closed. The mappings

X^{m} → X^{n}

defined by projecting out certain coordinates and setting others as constants are all continuous.

(B) For a projection

p: X^{m} → X^{n}

and an irreducible closed subset Y of X^{m}, p(Y) lies between its closure Z and Z \ Z′ where Z′ is a proper closed subset of Z. (This is quantifier elimination, at an abstract level.)

(C) X is irreducible.

(D) There is a uniform bound on the number of elements of a fiber in a projection of any closed set in X^{m}, other than the cases where the fiber is X.

(E) A closed irreducible subset of X^{m}, of dimension r, when intersected with a diagonal subset in which s coordinates are set equal, has all components of dimension at least r − s + 1.

The further condition required is called very ample (cf. very ample line bundle). It is assumed there is an irreducible closed subset P of some X^{m}, and an irreducible closed subset Q of P× X^{2}, with the following properties:

(I) Given pairs (x, y), (x′, y′) in X^{2}, for some t in P, the set of (t, u, v) in Q includes (t, x, y) but not (t, x′, y′)

(J) For t outside a proper closed subset of P, the set of (x, y) in X^{2}, (t, x, y) in Q is an irreducible closed set of dimension 1.

(K) For all pairs (x, y), (x′, y′) in X^{2}, selected from outside a proper closed subset, there is some t in P such that the set of (t, u, v) in Q includes (t, x, y) and (t, x′, y′).

Geometrically this says there are enough curves to separate points (I), and to connect points (K); and that such curves can be taken from a single parametric family.

Then Hrushovski and Zilber prove that under these conditions there is an algebraically closed field K, and a non-singular algebraic curve C, such that its Zariski geometry of powers and their Zariski topology is isomorphic to the given one. In short, the geometry can be algebraized.
