= Natasha Dobrinen =

American mathematician

- Occupation: Mathematician

Academic background
- Education: University of California, Berkeley (BA 1996); University of Minnesota (PhD 2001)
- Thesis: Generalized Weak Distributive Laws in Boolean Algebras and Issues Related to a Problem of von Neumann Regarding Measurable Algebras
- Doctoral advisor: Karel Prikry

Academic work
- Discipline: Mathematician
- Sub-discipline: Set theory; Infinitary combinatorics
- Institutions: University of Denver (2007–2022); University of Notre Dame (2022–)

Natasha Lynne Dobrinen is an American mathematician specializing in set theory and infinitary combinatorics. She is a professor of mathematics at the University of Notre Dame and the president of the Association for Symbolic Logic.

== Early life and education ==
Dobrinen grew up in San Francisco, where she attended Lowell High School. She graduated from the University of California, Berkeley in 1996, with an honors thesis on the prime number theorem supervised by Richard Borcherds.

After deciding to continue in mathematics rather than, as originally planned, medicine, she continued her education at the University of Minnesota, where she completed her Ph.D. in 2001 with the dissertation Generalized Weak Distributive Laws in Boolean Algebras and Issues Related to a Problem of von Neumann Regarding Measurable Algebras supervised by Karel Prikry.

Following her doctorate, Dobrinen became a postdoctoral researcher with Steve Simpson at the Pennsylvania State University from 2001 to 2004, and with Sy Friedman at the University of Vienna's Kurt Gödel Research Center for Mathematical Logic from 2004 to 2007.

== Career ==
She joined the University of Denver Department of Mathematics as an assistant professor in 2007, and was promoted there to associate professor in 2011 and full professor in 2016. In 2022 she moved to her present position at the University of Notre Dame.

She was elected as president of the Association for Symbolic Logic for a term to run from 2025 to 2028.

== Recognition ==
Dobrinen was an invited speaker at the 2022 International Congress of Mathematicians, held virtually.

== Personal life ==
Dobrinen is Christian and views her work in mathematics as a religious calling.

== Selected publications ==
- Dobrinen, Natasha; Simpson, Steve (2004), "Almost everywhere domination" (PDF), The Journal of Symbolic Logic, 69 (3): 914–922
- Dobrinen, Natasha; Todorcevic, Stevo (2011), "Tukey types of ultrafilters" (PDF), Illinois Journal of Mathematics, 55 (3): 907–951
- Dobrinen, Natasha; Todorcevic, Stevo (2014), "A new class of Ramsey-classification theorems and their application in the Tukey theory of ultrafilters, Part 1" (PDF), Transactions of the American Mathematical Society, 366 (3): 1659–1684
- Dobrinen, Natasha (2020), "The Ramsey theory of the universal homogeneous triangle-free graph", Journal of Mathematical Logic, 20 (2): 2050012
