= Omega-logic =

In mathematics, ω-logic can refer to:

- ω-logic, an infinitary extension of first-order logic
- Ω-logic, a deductive system in set theory developed by Hugh Woodin
