= Élisabeth Bouscaren =

French mathematician (born 1956)

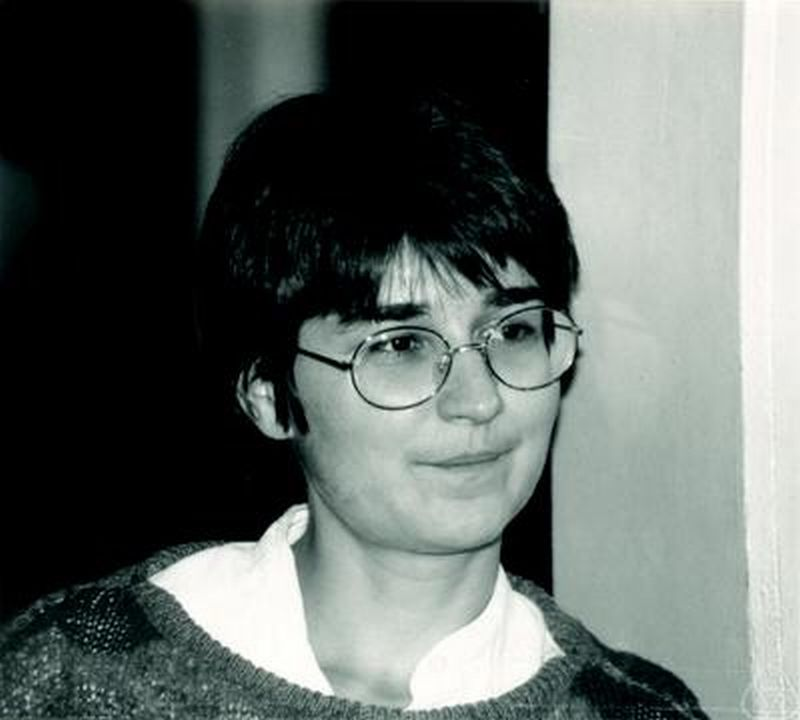
- Bouscaren at Oberwolfach in 1988
- Born: 1956 (age 69–70)

Academic background
- Education: University of Paris VII

Academic work
- Discipline: Mathematics
- Institutions: University of Paris XI, French National Center for Scientific Research
- Main interests: Algebraic geometry, Model theory

Élisabeth Bouscaren (born 1956) is a French mathematician who works on algebraic geometry, algebra and mathematical logic (model theory).

== Education and career ==
Bouscaren received her doctorate in 1979 from the University of Paris VII and her habilitation in 1985. From 1981 she worked at the French National Center for Scientific Research (CNRS) until 2005, when she moved to the University of Paris XI. Since 2007, she has held the position of Research Director at CNRS.

She has been a visiting scholar at Yale University, the University of Notre Dame and MSRI, and has published a book on Ehud Hrushovski's proof of the Mordell-Lang conjecture. She was an invited speaker in the logic session of the 2002 International Congress of Mathematicians.

In 2020, Bouscaren gave the Gödel Lecture, titled The ubiquity of configurations in Model Theory.

== Selected publications ==
- Bouscaren, Elisabeth (2005), "Model theory and geometry", Logic Colloquium 2000, Lecture Notes in Logic, vol. 19, Urbana, IL: Association for Symbolic Logic, pp. 3–31, MR 2143876
- Bouscaren, E.; Delon, F. (2002), "Groups definable in separably closed fields", Transactions of the American Mathematical Society, 354 (3): 945–966, doi:10.1090/S0002-9947-01-02886-0, MR 1867366
- Bouscaren, E.; Delon, F. (2002), "Minimal groups in separably closed fields", Journal of Symbolic Logic, 67 (1): 239–259, doi:10.2178/jsl/1190150042, MR 1889549
- Bouscaren, Élisabeth (2002), "Théorie des modèles et conjecture de Manin-Mumford (d'après Ehud Hrushovski)" [Model theory and the Manin-Mumford conjecture (following Ehud Hrushovski)], Astérisque (in French) (276): 137–159, MR 1886759, Séminaire Bourbaki 1999/2000
- Bouscaren, Elisabeth, ed. (1998), Model Theory and Algebraic Geometry: An introduction to E. Hrushovski's proof of the Geometric Mordell–Lang Conjecture, Lecture Notes in Mathematics, vol. 1696, Berlin: Springer-Verlag, doi:10.1007/978-3-540-68521-0, ISBN 3-540-64863-1, MR 1678586
- Bouscaren, E.; Hrushovski, E. (1994), "On one-based theories", Journal of Symbolic Logic, 59 (2): 579–595, doi:10.2307/2275409, MR 1276634
