= Joan Bagaria =

Catalan mathematician

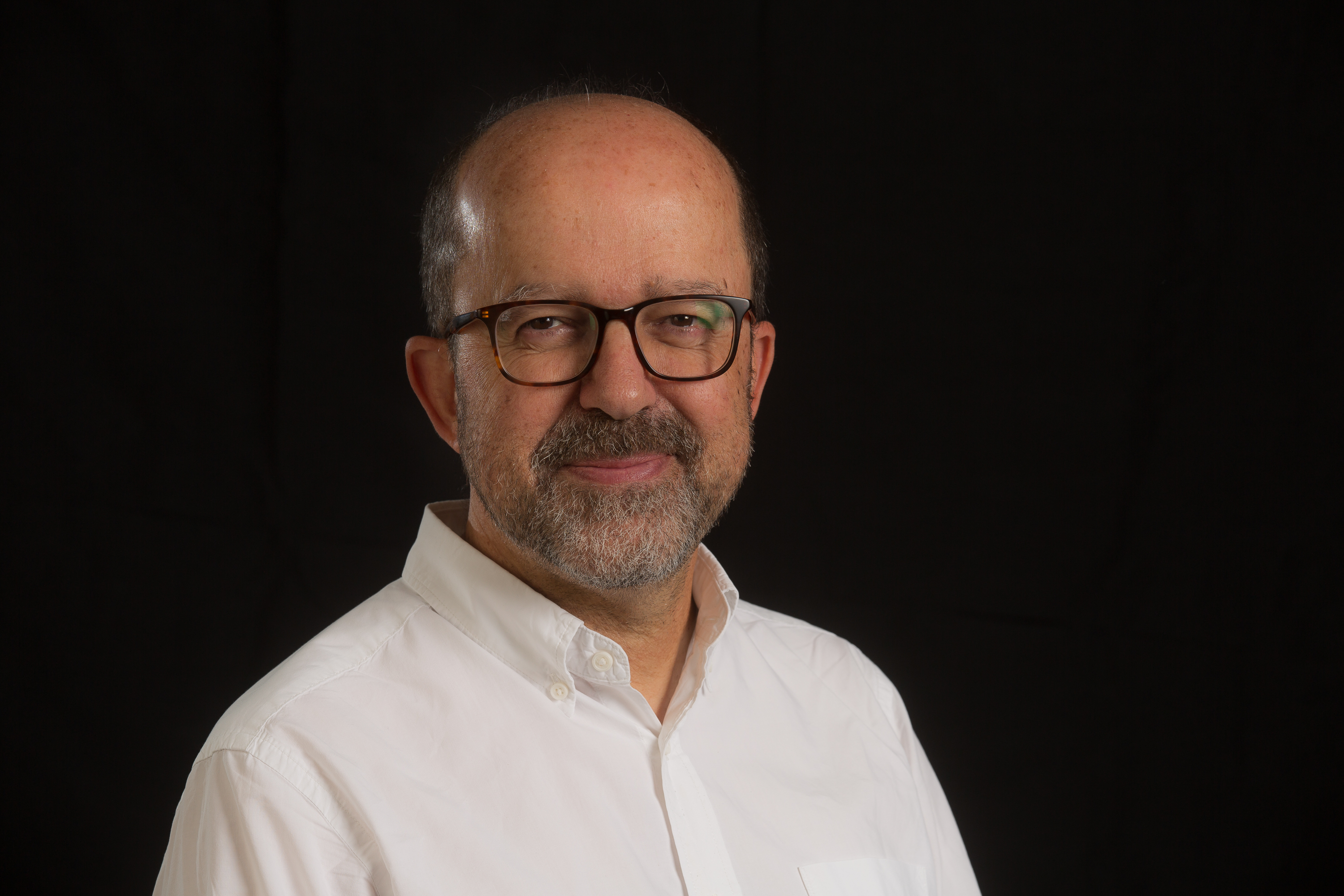
- Joan Bagaria in 2018
- Born: August 17, 1958 (age 68); Manlleu (Catalonia)
- Citizenship: Spanish
- Education: Universitat de Barcelona and University of California, Berkeley
- Scientific career
- Thesis: Definable forcing and regularity properties of projective sets of reals (1991)
- Doctoral advisor: W. Hugh Woodin
- Website: https://www.icrea.cat/Web/ScientificStaff/joan--bagaria-i-pigrau-119

Joan Bagaria Pigrau (born August 17, 1958) is a Catalan mathematician, logician and set theorist at ICREA and University of Barcelona. He has made many contributions concerning forcing, large cardinals, infinite combinatorics and their applications to other areas of mathematics.

== Biography ==
=== Early life (1958 – 1992) ===
Bagaria was born in 1958 in Manlleu, Catalonia, Spain. He earned a B.A. in philosophy from the University of Barcelona in 1981, and an M.A. in philosophy there in 1984. He earned his PhD in Logic & the Methodology of Science at the University of California, Berkeley in 1991 under the supervision of Haim Judah and W. Hugh Woodin. He also held various other positions at UC Berkeley between January 1986 and May 1992, including as a reader, a graduate student instructor, a junior specialist, and a summer session instructor.

=== Career (1992 – present) ===
In June 1992, Bagaria returned to Catalonia as an invited researcher at the Centre de Recerca Matemàtica, where he remained until that September. From October 1992 to September 1995, he was an interim research professor at the Autonomous University of Barcelona. He was an invited professor at Pompeu Fabra University from October 1995 to September 1996. Then he got an interim associate professor position at University of Barcelona, which he held until October 2001.

Since 2001, he has been ICREA Research Professor at University of Barcelona. He served as the first president of the European Set Theory Society (2007–11).

His research work is widely cited, and he has given talks to the general public. He has had nine PhD students.

=== Personal life ===
He is also an active Catalan independentist.

== Some publications ==
- J. Bagaria (1997). "A characterization of Martin's axiom in terms of absoluteness". Journal of Symbolic Logic. 62 (2): 366–372. doi:10.2307/2275537. JSTOR 2275537. S2CID 31983664.
- J. Bagaria (2000). "Bounded forcing axioms as principles of generic absoluteness". Archive for Mathematical Logic. 39 (6): 393–401. doi:10.1007/s001530050154. S2CID 40480131.
- D. Asperó & J. Bagaria (2001). "Bounded forcing axioms and the continuum". Annals of Pure and Applied Logic. 109 (3): 179–203. doi:10.1016/S0168-0072(00)00058-0.
- J. Bagaria & J. López-Abad (2001). "Weakly Ramsey Sets in Banach Spaces". Advances in Mathematics. 160 (2): 133–174. doi:10.1006/aima.2001.1983.
- J. Bagaria & J. López-Abad (2002). "Determinacy and weakly Ramsey sets in Banach spaces". Transactions of the American Mathematical Society. 354 (4): 1327–1349. doi:10.1090/S0002-9947-01-02926-9. hdl:2445/7783.
- J. Bagaria & R. Bosch (2004). "Solovay models and forcing extensions". Journal of Symbolic Logic. 69 (3): 742–766. doi:10.2178/jsl/1096901764. S2CID 31614083.
- J. Bagaria (2008). "Set Theory". In T. Gowers; J. Barrow-Green; I. Leader (eds.). The Princeton Companion to Mathematics. Princeton University Press. ISBN 978-0-691-11880-2.
- J. Bagaria (2012). "C(n)-cardinals". Archive for Mathematical Logic. 51 (3–4): 213–240. doi:10.1007/s00153-011-0261-8. S2CID 208867731.
- J. Bagaria & M. Magidor (2014). "Group radicals and strongly compact cardinals". Transactions of the American Mathematical Society. 366 (4): 1857–1877. doi:10.1090/S0002-9947-2013-05871-0.
- J. Bagaria; C. Casacuberta; A.R.D. Mathias & J. Rosický (2015). "Definable orthogonality classes in accessible categories are small". Journal of the European Mathematical Society. 17 (3): 549–589. arXiv:1101.2792. doi:10.4171/JEMS/511. S2CID 119164862.
- J. Bagaria; J. D. Hamkins; K. Tsaprounis & T. Usuba (2016). "Superstrong and other large cardinals are never Laver indestructible". Archive for Mathematical Logic. 55 (1–2): 19–35. arXiv:1307.3486. doi:10.1007/s00153-015-0458-3. S2CID 42939147.
