= 0† =

Subset of the natural numbers in set theory

In set theory, 0^{†} (zero dagger) is a particular subset of the natural numbers, first defined by Robert M. Solovay in unpublished work in the 1960s. The definition is a bit awkward, because there might be no set of natural numbers satisfying the conditions. Specifically, if ZFC is consistent, then ZFC + "0^{†} does not exist" is consistent. ZFC + "0^{†} exists" is not known to be inconsistent (and most set theorists believe that it is consistent). In other words, it is believed to be independent (see large cardinal for a discussion). It is usually formulated as follows:

0^{†} exists if and only if there exists a non-trivial elementary embedding j : L[U] → L[U] for the relativized Gödel constructible universe L[U], where U is an ultrafilter witnessing that some cardinal κ is measurable.

If 0^{†} exists, then a careful analysis of the embeddings of L[U] into itself reveals that there is a closed unbounded subset of κ, and a closed unbounded proper class of ordinals greater than κ, which together are indiscernible for the structure (L, ∈, U), and 0^{†} is defined to be the set of Gödel numbers of the true formulas about the indiscernibles in L[U].

Solovay showed that the existence of 0^{†} follows from the existence of two measurable cardinals. It is traditionally considered a large cardinal axiom, although it is not even a cardinal, let alone a large one.

== See also ==
- 0^{#}: a set of formulas (or subset of the integers) defined in a similar fashion, but simpler.
