= Universally Baire set =

In the mathematical field of descriptive set theory, a set of real numbers (or more generally a subset of the Baire space or Cantor space) is called universally Baire if it has a certain strong regularity property. Universally Baire sets play an important role in Ω-logic, a very strong logical system invented by W. Hugh Woodin and the centerpiece of his argument against the continuum hypothesis of Georg Cantor.

== Definition ==
A subset A of the Baire space is universally Baire if it has the following equivalent properties:

1. For every notion of forcing, there are trees T and U such that A is the projection of the set of all branches through T, and it is forced that the projections of the branches through T and the branches through U are complements of each other.
2. For every compact Hausdorff space Ω, and every continuous function f from Ω to the Baire space, the preimage of A under f has the property of Baire in Ω.
3. For every cardinal λ and every continuous function f from λ^{ω} to the Baire space, the preimage of A under f has the property of Baire.
