= Thomas Scanlon =

Thomas Scanlon may refer to:

- T. M. Scanlon (born 1940), former professor of philosophy at Harvard University
- Thomas E. Scanlon (1896–1955), U.S. congressman from Pennsylvania
- Thomas F. Scanlon, professor of Classics, University of California, Riverside
- Thomas W. Scanlon, American mathematician
