= Concha Gómez =

Italian-American and Cuban-American mathematician

- Education: University of California, Berkeley (B.A., Ph.D.)
- Scientific career
- Workplaces: University of Wisconsin–Madison; Diablo Valley College
- Thesis: Definability in p-adic power series rings (2000)
- Doctoral advisors: Leo Harrington
- Other academic advisors: Jenny Harrison; Donald Sarason

Concha Maria Gómez is an American mathematician. She is a professor of mathematics at Diablo Valley College. Gómez is known for being one of the co-founders of the women's organization The Noetherian Ring at the University of California Berkeley in 1991 while attending as a doctoral student. She is an advocate for diversity in the STEM fields and worked for the Wisconsin Emerging Scholars program of the University of Wisconsin–Madison, whose goal was to promote retention of minority students in STEM.

== Early life and education ==
Gómez was born to Patricia M. Difanis Gómez and Nicolas Humberto Gómez. She attended University of Wisconsin–Madison for two years before dropping out due to lack of funds and support. She moved from Madison to San Francisco at the age of 20 and worked odd jobs before taking classes for fun at a community college. Gómez eventually transferred to University of California, Berkeley and earned a B.A. and Ph.D. in mathematics in 2000.

Her dissertation was titled "Definability in p-adic power series rings." Leo Harrington was her doctoral advisor. Jack Silver and Deborah A. Nolan served on her dissertation committee. Gómez cites the support of Jenny Harrison and Donald Sarason for encouraging her to form relationships with mathematicians outside of UC Berkeley. Gómez is known for being one of the co-founders of the women's organization The Noetherian Ring at the University of California Berkeley in 1991 while attending as a doctoral student.

== Career ==
Gómez was an assistant professor of mathematics at Middlebury College. In the fall of 2004, she began working at University of Wisconsin–Madison in a non-tenure track position to teach math and direct the Wisconsin Emerging Scholars (WES) program whose goal was to promote retention of minority students in STEM. In 2006, Gómez cited Wisconsin's passing a constitutional amendment banning same-sex marriage as a motivation to seek academic employment elsewhere. She is a professor of mathematics at Diablo Valley College where she is also fostering a support network of Latinx faculty and students. She is an advocate for diversity in the STEM fields.

Gomez is included in a deck of playing cards featuring notable women mathematicians published by the Association of Women in Mathematics.

== Personal life ==
Concha Gómez was diagnosed with multiple sclerosis as a doctoral student.
