= Iterable cardinal =

In mathematics, an iterable cardinal is a type of large cardinal introduced by Gitman, and Sharpe and Welch in 2011, and further studied by Gitman and Welch in the same year. Sharpe and Welch defined a cardinal κ to be iterable if every subset of κ is contained in a weak κ-model M for which there exists an M-ultrafilter on κ which allows for wellfounded iterations by ultrapowers of arbitrary length. Gitman gave a finer notion, where a cardinal κ is defined to be α-iterable if ultrapower iterations only of length α are required to wellfounded (by standard arguments iterability is equivalent to ω_{1}-iterability.)

== Strength relative to other large cardinals ==
For any ordinal α, the α-Erdős cardinal is stronger than the α-iterable cardinal which is stronger than the β-Erdős cardinal for β < α.

1-iterable cardinals are weaker than remarkable cardinals and virtually extendible cardinals which are weaker than 2-iterable cardinals.

ω-iterable cardinals are weaker than virtually rank-into-rank cardinals which are weaker than ω+1-iterable cardinals.

If α < ω_{1}, then α-iterable cardinals are weaker than Silver cardinals. The ω_{1}-iterable cardinal is stronger than zero sharp (0^{#}).
