= Existential closedness conjecture =

Mathematical conjecture

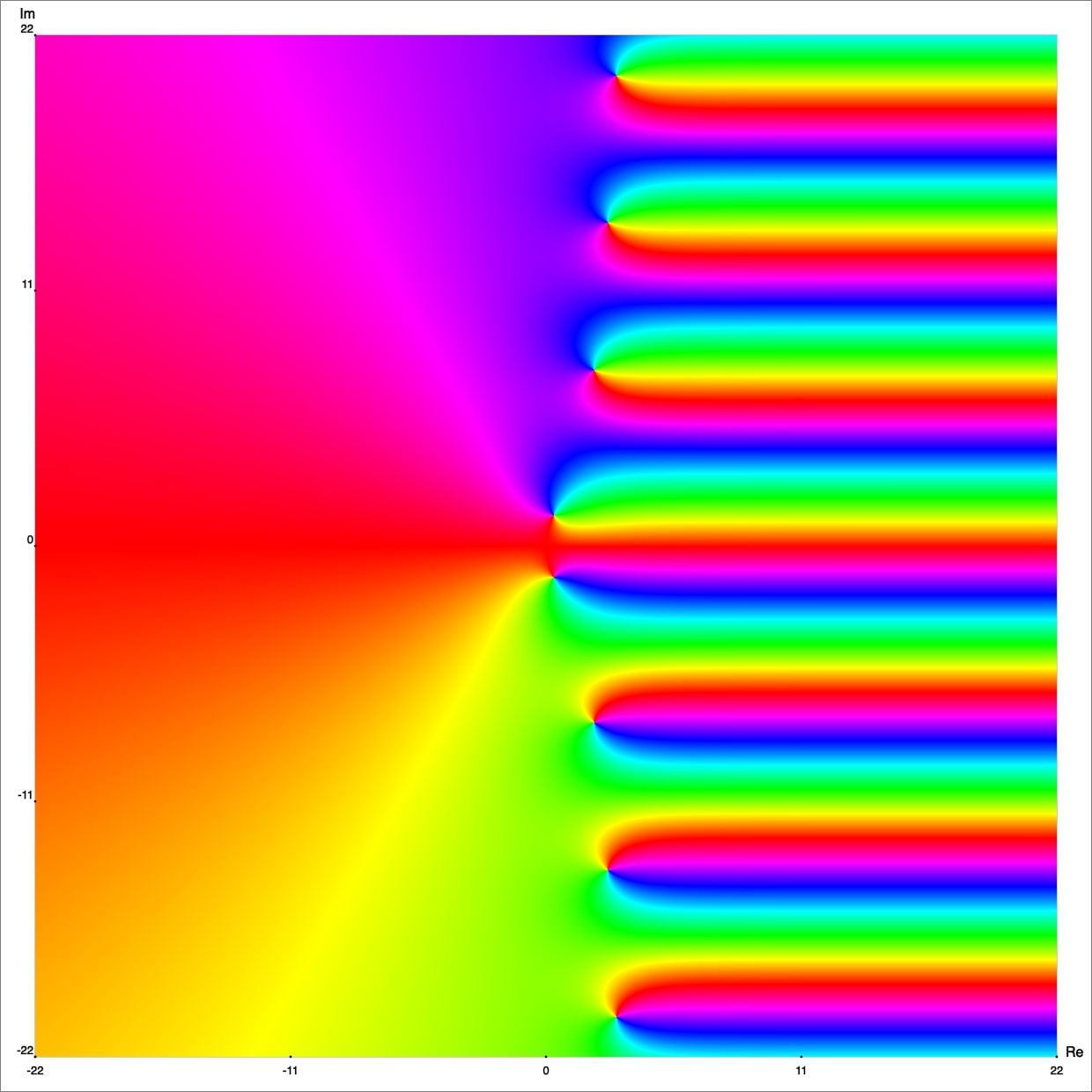
Domain colouring plot of $\exp(z)-z$ in the complex plane. Black points represent the zeroes of the function.

In mathematics, specifically in the fields of model theory and complex geometry, Existential Closedness problems aim to determine when systems of equations in several variables involving addition, multiplication, and some special meromorphic transcendental functions (e.g. exponential or modular functions) have solutions in the complex numbers. This question arises naturally in model theory of analytic functions. For certain transcendental functions, this question is conjecturally answered by the Existential Closedness conjecture for the function under consideration. These conjectures can be seen as generalisations of the Fundamental Theorem of Algebra and Hilbert's Nullstellensatz which are about solvability of (systems of) polynomial equations in the complex numbers.

An Existential Closedness conjecture was first proposed by Boris Zilber in his work on the model theory of complex exponentiation. Zilber's conjecture is known as Exponential Closedness or Exponential Algebraic Closedness and covers the case of Existential Closedness when the transcendental function involved is the complex exponential function. It was later generalised to exponential functions of semiabelian varieties, and analogous conjectures were proposed for modular functions and Shimura varieties.

== Statement ==
Informally, given a complex transcendental function $f$, the Existential Closedness conjecture for $f$ states that systems of equations involving field operations and $f$ always have solutions in $\mathbb{C}$ unless the existence of a solution would trivially contradict the (hypothetical) algebraic and transcendental properties of $f$. Two precise cases are considered below.

=== Exponential Closedness ===
In the case of the exponential function $\exp : \mathbb{C} \to \mathbb{C}^{\times}: z \mapsto e^z$, the algebraic property referred to above is given by the identity $\exp(z_1+z_2) = \exp(z_1) \cdot \exp(z_2)$. Its transcendental properties are assumed to be captured by Schanuel's conjecture. The latter is a long-standing open problem in transcendental number theory and implies in particular that $e$ and $\pi$ are algebraically independent over the rationals.

Some systems of equations cannot have solutions because of these properties. For instance, the system $z_2=2z_1+1, \exp(z_2) = (\exp(z_1))^2$ has no solutions, and similarly for any non-zero polynomial $p(X,Y)$ with rational coefficients the system $\exp(z)= -1, p(z, \exp(1))=0$ has no solution if we assume $e$ and $\pi$ are algebraically independent. The latter is an example of an overdetermined system, where we have more equations than variables. Exponential Closedness states that a system of equations, which is not overdetermined and which cannot be reduced to an overdetermined system by using the above-mentioned algebraic property of $\exp$, always has solutions in the complex numbers. Formally, every free and rotund system of exponential equations has a solution. Freeness and rotundity are technical conditions capturing the notion of a non-overdetermined system.

=== Modular Existential Closedness ===
In the modular setting the transcendental function under consideration is the $j$-function. Its algebraic properties are governed by the transformation rules under the action of $\mathrm{GL}_2^+(\mathbb{Q})$ – the group of $2\times 2$ rational matrices with positive determinant – on the upper half-plane. The transcendental properties of $j$ are captured by the Modular Schanuel Conjecture.

Modular Existential Closedness states that every free and broad system of equations involving field operations and the $j$-function has a complex solution, where freeness and broadness play the role of freeness and rotundity mentioned above.

=== Relation to Schanuel's conjecture ===
Existential Closedness can be seen as a dual statement to Schanuel's conjecture or its analogue in the appropriate setting. Schanuel implies that certain systems of equations cannot have solutions (or solutions which are independent in some sense, e.g. linearly independent) as the above example of exponential equations demonstrates. Then Existential Closedness can be interpreted roughly as stating that solutions exists unless their existence would contradict Schanuel's conjecture. This is the approach used by Zilber. His axiomatisation of pseudo-exponentiation prominently features Schanuel and a strong version of Existential Closedness which is indeed dual to Schanuel. This strong version predicts existence of generic solutions and follows from the combination of the Existential Closedness, Schanuel, and Zilber-Pink conjectures. However, Existential Closedness is a natural conjecture in its own right and makes sense without necessarily assuming Schanuel's conjecture (or any other conjecture). In fact, Schanuel's conjecture is considered out of reach while Existential Closedness seems to be much more tractable as evidenced by recent developments, some of which are discussed below.

=== Terminology ===
The name Existential Closedness comes from the model-theoretic property of structures, known as existential closedness, describing when quantifier-free formulas with a realisation in a larger model already have a realisation in the original model. In the setting of complex functions, the Existential Closedness conjecture does not imply that the complex field equipped with the given function is existentially closed in a first-order sense; instead, it is existentially closed in certain self-sufficient extensions.

== Partial results and special cases ==
The Existential Closedness conjecture is open in full generality both in the exponential and modular settings, but many special cases and weak versions have been proven. For instance, the conjecture (in both settings) has been proven assuming dominant projection: any system of polynomial equations in the variables $z_1,...,z_n$ and $\exp(z_1),...,\exp(z_n)$ (or $j(z_1),...,j(z_n)$), which does not imply any algebraic relation between $z_1,...,z_n$, has complex solutions. Another important special case is the solvability of systems of raising to powers type. Differential/functional analogues of the Existential Closedness conjecture have also been proven.

== See also ==
- Schanuel's conjecture
- Zilber–Pink conjecture
- Boris Zilber
