= Joseph R. Shoenfield =

American mathematician (1927–2000)

Joseph Robert Shoenfield
- Born: Detroit, Michigan, US
- Died: November 15, 2000 (aged 73); Durham, North Carolina, US
- Education: University of Michigan
- Known for: Shoenfield absoluteness theorem
- Awards: Gödel Lecture (1992)
- Scientific career
- Fields: Mathematical logic
- Workplaces: Duke University
- Thesis: Models of Formal Systems (1953)
- Doctoral advisor: Raymond Louis Wilder

Joseph Robert Shoenfield (May 1, 1927, in Detroit, Michigan – November 15, 2000, in Durham, North Carolina) was an American mathematical logician.

== Education ==
Shoenfield obtained his PhD in 1953 with Raymond Louis Wilder at the University of Michigan (Models of formal systems).

== Career ==
From 1952, he lectured at Duke University, where he remained until becoming emeritus in 1992. From 1970 to 1973 he was president of the mathematics faculty. In 1956/57 he was at the Institute for Advanced Study. Shoenfield worked on recursion theory, model theory and axiomatic set theory. His textbook on mathematical logic has become a classic.

== Honors ==
From 1972 to 1976 he was president of the Association for Symbolic Logic. He delivered the Gödel Lecture at the 1992 meeting of the ASL.

== Hobbies ==
In his student days, Schoenfield was a contract bridge player. He was an early member of the American Go Association; the memorial tournament in North Carolina was founded in his memory.

== Selected publications ==
- Mathematical Logic, Addison Wesley 1967, 2nd edition, Association for Symbolic Logic, 2001
- Degrees of unsolvability, North Holland Mathematical Studies 1971
- Recursion theory, Springer 1993
