= Donja Pecka =

Village in Bosnia and Herzegovina

Donja Pecka is a populated place in the municipality of Mrkonjić Grad, Bosnia and Herzegovina and the local community of Gornja Pecka.

== Name ==
There are several legends about the name Pecka. One brick was baked here, hence the name Peck. Secondly, immigrants from the village of the same name in Serbia came here. In the end, the name of this village is associated with respect for St. Petka. Pecka is mentioned in Turkish documents as Kozara.

== History ==
As early as the third century, the Roman city of Sarnade existed here on the Salona-Servitium road (Bosnian Gradiška), later called the Thurman Road. Sarnada is also associated with the conclusions of the Salonitan Council of 530, where the pastor or archpriest of the parish of Sarnada was a signatory to the conclusions of the council. The parish at that time belonged to the diocese of Sisak.

== Demographics ==
Ethnic makeup of Donja Pecka
	1991.	2013.
Bosniaks	0 (0%)	0 (0%)
Croats	0 (0%)	0 (0%)
Serbs	108 (100%)	20 (90.9%)
Others	0 (0%)	2 (9.1%)
Total	108	22
