= Gornja Pecka =

Gornja Pecka Горња Пецка
- Village
- Location within Bosnia and Herzegovina
- Coordinates: 44°18′42″N 16°53′19″E
- Country: Bosnia and Herzegovina
- Entity: Republika Srpska
- Municipality: Mrkonjić Grad

Government
  - President of the Local community council: Pero Dakić

Population (2013)
  - Total: 125
- (Settlement)
- Time zone: UTC+1 (CET)
  - Summer (DST): UTC+2 (CEST)

Gornja Pecka (Serbian Cyrillic: Горња Пецка) is a village and local community in the municipality of Mrkonjić Grad, Republika Srpska, Bosnia and Herzegovina. The Gornja Pecka local community encompasses the following settlements: Gornja Pecka, Donja Pecka and Ubovića Brdo.

== Demographics ==
Ethnic makeup of Gornja Pecka (settlement)
	1991.	2013.
Bosniaks	0 (0%)	0 (0%)
Croats	0 (0%)	1 (0.8%)
Serbs	364 (98.6%)	124 (99.2%)
Others	5 (1.4%)	0 (0%)
Total	369	125
