= Erdős cardinal =

Large cardinal number

In mathematics, an Erdős cardinal, also called a partition cardinal is a certain kind of large cardinal number introduced by Paul Erdős and András Hajnal (1958).

A cardinal $\kappa$ is called $\alpha$-Erdős if for every function $f:[\kappa]^{<\omega} \to \{0,1\}$, there is a set of order type $\alpha$ that is homogeneous for $f$. In the notation of the partition calculus, $\kappa$ is $\alpha$-Erdős if

$$\kappa \rightarrow (\alpha)^{<\omega}$$.

Under this definition, any cardinal larger than the least $\alpha$-Erdős cardinal is $\alpha$-Erdős.

The existence of zero sharp implies that the constructible universe $L$ satisfies "for every countable ordinal $\alpha$, there is an $\alpha$-Erdős cardinal". In fact, for every indiscernible $\kappa$, $L_\kappa$ satisfies "for every ordinal $\alpha$, there is an $\alpha$-Erdős cardinal in $\mathrm{Coll}(\omega, \alpha)$" (the Lévy collapse to make $\alpha$ countable).

However, the existence of an $\omega_1$-Erdős cardinal implies existence of zero sharp. If $f$ is the satisfaction relation for $L$ (using ordinal parameters), then the existence of zero sharp is equivalent to there being an $\omega_1$-Erdős ordinal with respect to $f$. Thus, the existence of an $\omega_1$-Erdős cardinal implies that the axiom of constructibility is false.

The least $\omega$-Erdős cardinal is not weakly compact,^{p. 39.} nor is the least $\omega_1$-Erdős cardinal.^{p. 39}

If $\kappa$ is $\alpha$-Erdős, then it is $\alpha$-Erdős in every transitive model satisfying "$\alpha$ is countable."

== Dodd's notion of Erdős cardinals ==
For a limit ordinal $\alpha$, a cardinal $\kappa$ is less often called $\alpha$-Erdős if for every closed unbounded $C\subseteq\kappa$ and every function $f:[C]^{<\omega}\rightarrow\kappa$ such that $f(x)<\min(x)$ for all $x\in [C]^{<\omega}$, there is a set $H\subseteq C$ of order-type $\alpha$ that is homogeneous for $f$.^{p. 138.}

An equivalent definition is that $\kappa$ is $\alpha$-Erdős if for any $A\subseteq\kappa$, there is a set $I$ of order-type $\alpha$ of order-indiscernibles for the structure $(L_\kappa[A];\in, A)$ such that:

- for every $\beta\in I$, $(L_\beta[A];\in, A)\prec (L_\kappa[A];\in, A)$, and
- for every $\gamma<\kappa$, the set $I\setminus\gamma$ forms a set of order-indiscernibles for the structure $(L_\kappa[A];\in, A, \xi)_{\xi<\gamma}$.

The least cardinal $\kappa$ to satisfy the partition relation $\kappa \rightarrow (\alpha)^{<\omega}$ is still $\alpha$-Erdős under this definition. Every $\omega$-Erdős cardinal is an inaccessible limit of ineffable cardinals.

== Strength relative to other large cardinals ==
For any ordinal α, α-Erdős cardinal is stronger than α-iterable cardinal, but weaker than α+1-iterable cardinal. virtually rank-into-rank cardinal is weaker than ω-Erdős cardinal. If α < ω_{1}, then α-Erdős cardinal is weaker than Silver cardinal. ω_{1}-Erdős cardinal is stronger than zero sharp.

== See also ==
- List of large cardinal properties
