= Stevo Todorčević =

Yugoslavian mathematician

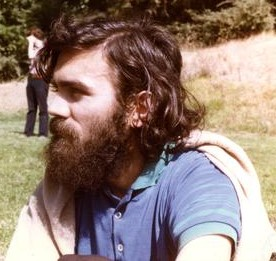
- Todorčević in 1984
- Born: February 9, 1955 (age 71); Ubovića Brdo, Yugoslavia (now Bosnia and Herzegovina)
- Education: University of Belgrade
- Awards: Balkan Mathematical Society First Prize 1980, 1982; CRM-Fields-PIMS Prize (2012); Shoenfield Prize (2013); Gödel Lecture (2016)
- Scientific career
- Fields: set theory; mathematical logic; topological dynamics; set-theoretic topology
- Workplaces: University of Toronto; CNRS
- Thesis: Results and Independence Proofs in Combinatorial Set Theory (1979)
- Doctoral advisor: Đuro Kurepa
- Doctoral students: Ilijas Farah; Justin T. Moore

Stevo Todorčević FRSC (Serbian Cyrillic: Стево Тодорчевић; born February 9, 1955), is a Canadian-Serbian mathematician specializing in logic and set theory. He holds a Canada Research Chair in mathematics at the University of Toronto, and a director of research position at the Centre national de la recherche scientifique in Paris.

== Early life and education ==
Todorčević was born in Ubovića Brdo. As a child, he moved to Banatsko Novo Selo, and went to school in Pančevo. At the University of Belgrade, he studied mathematics, attending lectures by Đuro Kurepa. He began graduate studies in 1978, and wrote his doctoral thesis in 1979 with Kurepa as his advisor.

== Research ==
Todorčević's work involves mathematical logic, set theory, and their applications to pure mathematics.

In Todorčević's 1978 master's thesis, he constructed a model of MA + ¬wKH in a way to allow him to make the continuum any regular cardinal, and so derived a variety of topological consequences. Here MA is an abbreviation for Martin's axiom and wKH stands for the weak Kurepa Hypothesis. In 1980, Todorčević and Abraham proved the existence of rigid Aronszajn trees and the consistency of MA + the negation of the continuum hypothesis + there exists a first countable S-space.

== Awards and honours ==
Todorčević is the winner of

- the first prize of the Balkan Mathematical Society for 1980 and 1982,
- the 2012 CRM-Fields-PIMS prize in mathematical sciences, and
- the Shoenfield prize of the Association for Symbolic Logic for "outstanding expository writing in the field of logic" in 2013, for his book Introduction to Ramsey Spaces.^{[IRS]}

He was selected by the Association for Symbolic Logic as their 2016 Gödel Lecturer.

He became a corresponding member of the Serbian Academy of Sciences and Arts as of 1991 and a full member of the academy in 2009. In 2016 Todorčević became a fellow of the Royal Society of Canada.

Todorčević has been described as "the greatest Serbian mathematician" since the time of Mihailo Petrović Alas.

== Books ==
Todorčević is the author of several books in mathematics, including:

- Partition Problems in Topology. Providence, R.I: American Mathematical Soc. 1989. ISBN 978-0-8218-5091-6. MR 0980949.
- (with Ilijas Farah) Some Applications of the Method of Forcing. Moscow: Yenisei. 1995. ISBN 978-5-88623-014-7. MR 1486583.
- Topics in Topology. Lecture Notes in Mathematics. Berlin; New York: Springer. 1997. ISBN 978-3-540-62611-4. MR 1442262.
- (with Spiros A. Argyros) Ramsey Methods in Analysis. Basel; Boston: Springer Science & Business Media. 2005. ISBN 978-3-7643-7264-4. MR 2145246.
- Walks on Ordinals and Their Characteristics. Basel: Birkhäuser. 2007. ISBN 978-3-7643-8528-6. MR 2355670. OCLC 166357947.
- Introduction to Ramsey Spaces. Annals of Mathematics Studies. Princeton: Princeton University Press. 2010. ISBN 978-0-691-14542-6. MR 2603812. OCLC 437054050.
- Notes on Forcing Axioms. New Jersey: World Scientific Publishing Company. 2014. ISBN 978-981-4571-57-9. MR 3184691.

== See also ==
- Baumgartner's axiom
- Kechris–Pestov–Todorčević correspondence
- Open coloring axiom
- S and L spaces

== Sources ==
- Larson, Jean A. (2012), "Infinite combinatorics", in Gabbay, Dov M.; Kanamori, Akihiro; Woods, John (eds.), Sets and extensions in the twentieth century, Handbook of the History of Logic, vol. 6, Amsterdam: Elsevier/North-Holland, pp. 145–357, doi:10.1016/B978-0-444-51621-3.50003-7, ISBN 978-0-444-51621-3, MR 3409860.
- RSC Fellowship Citation and Detailed Appraisal: Stevo Todorcevic
