= Ubovića Brdo =

Ubovića Brdo Убовића Брдо
- Village
- Location within Bosnia and Herzegovina
- Coordinates: 44°20′13″N 16°53′05″E
- Country: Bosnia and Herzegovina
- Entity: Republika Srpska
- Municipality: Mrkonjić Grad

Area
  - Total: 9.7 sq mi (25 km^{2})

Population (2013)
  - Total: 81
- Time zone: UTC+1 (CET)
  - Summer (DST): UTC+2 (CEST)

Ubovića Brdo (Serbian Cyrillic: Убовића Брдо) is a village in the Mrkonjić Grad municipality, Republic of Srpska, Bosnia and Herzegovina and the Gornja Pecka local community. The village is known for their yearly rock climbing competition and festivity called "Pecka Rock Climbing Festival".

== Name ==
Ubovića Brdo or Ubavića Brdo derives from the Ubović family. Ubav derives from the word (pretty, or beautiful). Brdo means 'hill', so a literal translation of the name would be 'Ubović's Hill'.

== Demographics ==
The village census shows that it had 593 inhabitants in 1953, reduced to only 81 in 2013 as a result of its inhabitants moving to busy cities with resources and jobs are more prevalent.

According to the 1991 census, the village had a total of 213 inhabitants. Ethnic groups in the village include:

- Serbs: 213 (100%)

According to the 2013 census, the village had a total of 81 inhabitants. Ethnic groups in the village include:

- Serbs 81 (100%)

== Famous people ==
The village is the birthplace of

- Stevo Todorčević, a world-renowned mathematician
- Tode Nikoletić, children's poet and writer

== Notes ==
=== References ===
- Udovčić, Rade (2007). Baraći i Baraćani (in Serbian). ISBN 978-99938-888-0-2.
