= Lou van den Dries =

Dutch mathematician

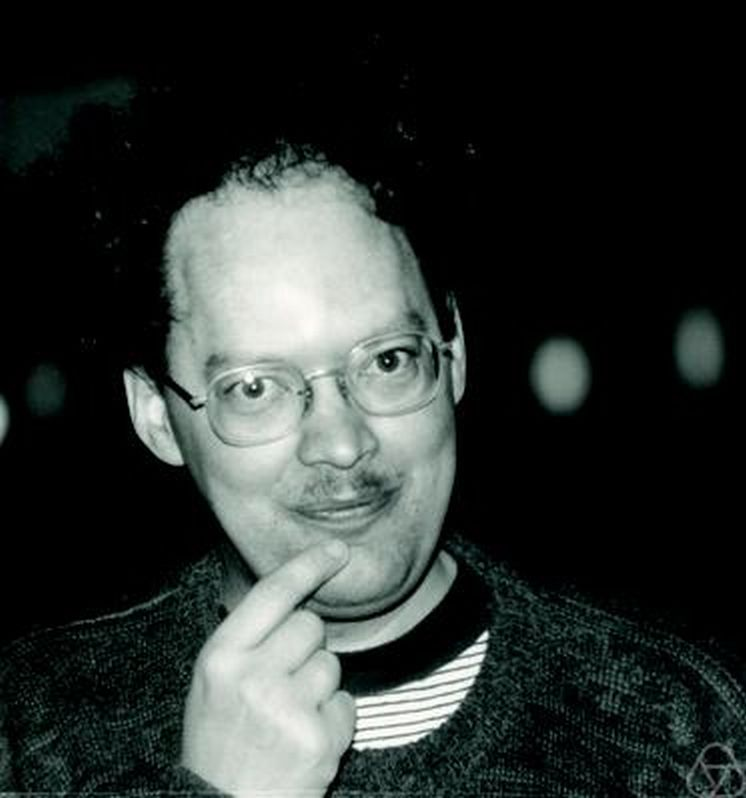
- Van den Dries at Oberwolfach, 1988
- Born: Laurentius Petrus Dignus van den Dries; May 26, 1951 (age 75); Ens, Netherlands
- Education: Utrecht University
- Awards: Shoenfield Prize (2016); Karp Prize (2018)
- Scientific career
- Fields: Mathematics
- Workplaces: University of Illinois Urbana-Champaign
- Thesis: Model Theory of Fields (1978)
- Doctoral advisor: Dirk van Dalen
- Doctoral students: Matthias Aschenbrenner

Laurentius Petrus Dignus "Lou" van den Dries (born May 26, 1951) is a Dutch mathematician working in model theory. He is a professor emeritus of mathematics at the University of Illinois Urbana-Champaign.

== Education ==
Van den Dries began his undergraduate studies in 1969 at Utrecht University, and in 1978 completed his PhD there under the supervision of Dirk van Dalen with a dissertation entitled Model Theory of Fields.

== Career and research ==
Van den Dries was a member of the Institute for Advanced Study in the 1982–1983 academic year. He joined the faculty of the University of Illinois Urbana-Champaign in 1986 and became a professor in its Center for Advanced Study in 1998. In 2021, van den Dries retired and became a professor emeritus.

Van den Dries is most known for his seminal work in o-minimality, but he has also made contributions to the model theory of p-adic fields, valued fields, and finite fields, and to the study of transseries. With Alex Wilkie, he improved Gromov's theorem on groups of polynomial growth using nonstandard methods. Van den Dries was an invited speaker at the International Congress of Mathematicians in 1990 and 2018, and delivered the Tarski Lectures at the University of California, Berkeley in 2017.

== Awards and honours ==
Van den Dries has been a corresponding member of the Royal Netherlands Academy of Arts and Sciences since 1993. He was awarded the Shoenfield Prize from the Association for Symbolic Logic in 2016 for his chapter "Lectures on the Model Theory of Valued Fields" in Model Theory in Algebra, Analysis and Arithmetic, edited by Dugald Macpherson and Carlo Toffalori. Van den Dries was jointly awarded the 2018 Karp Prize with Matthias Aschenbrenner and Joris van der Hoeven "for their work in model theory, especially on asymptotic differential algebra and the model theory of transseries".

== Ethics training ==
Since 2004, employees of the state of Illinois, including University of Illinois faculty, are required by the State Officials and Employees Ethics Act to complete ethics training annually. From 2006 to 2009, van den Dries refused to complete this training, arguing that

mandatory ethics training for adults is an Orwellian concept and has no place in a civil and free society. It is Big Brother reducing us to the status of children. Symptoms: monitoring of the test taking, the 'award' of a diploma for passing the test. It betrays a totalitarian urge on those in power to infantilize the rest of us.

An unfortunate byproduct of the computer revolution is that it has given new tools in the hands of unwise rulers to annoy us for no good reason. Rather than go meekly along, we should vigorously protest and resist whenever demeaning schemes like ethics training rear their ugly head.

Eventually, van den Dries settled with the Illinois Executive Ethics Commission, which enforces the ethics act, for a $500 fine, noting that "while many of my colleagues agree that this ethics training is a big waste of time and money, they didn't really take the steps I took in trying to fight it. So without active support from my colleagues, it became too time consuming and costly (lawyers fees) to continue my resistance." Van den Dries was the first state employee to be fined by the Illinois Executive Ethics Commission for failing to complete the mandatory training.

== Selected publications ==
- M. Aschenbrenner; L. van den Dries; J. van der Hoeven (2017). Asymptotic Differential Algebra and Model Theory of Transseries. Annals of Mathematics Studies. Vol. 195. Princeton University Press. arXiv:1509.02588. doi:10.1515/9781400885411. ISBN 9781400885411. MR 3585498. Zbl 1430.12002.
- Z. Chatzidakis; L. van den Dries; A. Macintyre (1992). "Definable sets over finite fields". J. Reine Angew. Math. 1992 (427): 107–135. doi:10.1515/crll.1992.427.107. MR 1162433. S2CID 118058593. Zbl 0759.11045.
- J. Denef; L. van den Dries (1988). "p-adic and real subanalytic sets". Ann. of Math. Series 2. 128 (1): 79–138. doi:10.2307/1971463. JSTOR 1971463. MR 0951508. Zbl 0693.14012.
- L. van den Dries (1998). Tame topology and o-minimal structures. London Mathematical Society Lecture Notes. Vol. 248. Cambridge University Press. doi:10.1017/CBO9780511525919. ISBN 9780511525919. MR 1633348. Zbl 0953.03045.
- L. van den Dries (2014), "Lectures on the Model Theory of Valued Fields", in H. Dugald Macpherson; C. Toffalori (eds.), Model Theory in Algebra, Analysis and Arithmetic, Lecture Notes in Mathematics, vol. 2111, Springer-Verlag, pp. 55–157, doi:10.1007/978-3-642-54936-6_4, ISBN 978-3-642-54935-9, MR 3330198, Zbl 1347.03074
- L. van den Dries; A. Macintyre; D. Marker (1994). "The elementary theory of restricted analytic fields with exponentiation". Ann. of Math. Series 2. 140 (1): 183–205. doi:10.2307/2118545. JSTOR 2118545. MR 1289495. S2CID 119703238. Zbl 0837.12006.
- L. van den Dries; C. Miller (1996). "Geometric categories and o-minimal structures". Duke Math. J. 84 (2): 497–540. doi:10.1215/S0012-7094-96-08416-1. MR 1404337. Zbl 0889.03025.
- L. van den Dries; K. Schmidt (1984). "Bounds in the theory of polynomial rings over fields. A nonstandard approach". Invent. Math. 76 (1): 77–91. Bibcode:1984InMat..76...77D. doi:10.1007/BF01388493. MR 0739626. S2CID 96471248. Zbl 0539.13011.
- L. van den Dries; A. Wilkie (1984). "Gromov's theorem of groups of polynomial growth and elementary logic". J. Algebra. 89 (2): 349–374. doi:10.1016/0021-8693(84)90223-0. MR 0751150. Zbl 0552.20017.
