= Indiscernibles =

Concept in mathematical logic

In mathematical logic, indiscernibles are objects that cannot be distinguished by any property or relation defined by a formula. Usually only first-order formulas without equality are considered.

== Examples ==
If a, b, and c are distinct and {a, b, c} is a set of indiscernibles, then, for example, for each binary formula $\beta$, we must have

$$[ \beta (a, b) \land \beta (b, a) \land \beta (a, c) \land \beta (c, a) \land \beta (b, c) \land \beta (c, b) ] \lor$$

$$[ \lnot \beta (a, b) \land \lnot \beta (b, a) \land \lnot \beta(a, c) \land \lnot \beta (c, a) \land \lnot \beta (b, c) \land \lnot \beta (c, b) ] \,.$$

Historically, the identity of indiscernibles was one of the laws of thought of Gottfried Leibniz.

== Generalizations ==
In some contexts one considers the more general notion of order-indiscernibles, and the term sequence of indiscernibles often refers implicitly to this weaker notion. In our example of binary formulas, to say that the triple (a, b, c) of distinct elements is a sequence of indiscernibles implies

$( [ \varphi (a, b) \land \varphi (a, c) \land \varphi (b, c) ] \lor [ \lnot \varphi (a, b) \land \lnot \varphi (a, c) \land \lnot \varphi (b, c) ] )$ and
$$( [ \varphi (b, a) \land \varphi (c, a) \land \varphi (c, b) ] \lor  [ \lnot \varphi (b, a) \land \lnot \varphi (c, a) \land \lnot \varphi (c, b) ] ) \,.$$

More generally, for a structure $\mathfrak A$ with domain $A$ and a linear ordering $<$, a set $I\subseteq A$ is said to be a set of $<$-indiscernibles for $\mathfrak A$ if for any finite subsets $\{i_0,\ldots,i_n\}\subseteq I$ and $\{j_0,\ldots,j_n\}\subseteq I$ with $i_0<\ldots<i_n$ and $j_0<\ldots<j_n$ and any first-order formula $\phi$ of the language of $\mathfrak A$ with $n$ free variables, $\mathfrak A\vDash\phi(i_0,\ldots,i_n) \iff \mathfrak A\vDash\phi(j_0,\ldots,j_n)$.^{p. 2}

== Applications ==
Order-indiscernibles feature prominently in the theory of Ramsey cardinals, Erdős cardinals, Silver cardinals, and zero sharp.

== See also ==
- Identity of indiscernibles
- Rough set
