= Alexander S. Kechris =

Greek set theorist and logician (born 1946)

- Born: March 23, 1946 (age 80); Greece
- Scientific career
- Fields: Mathematics
- Workplaces: California Institute of Technology
- Doctoral advisor: Yiannis N. Moschovakis
- Doctoral students: Jack Lutz; Sławomir Solecki

Alexander Sotirios Kechris (Greek: Αλέξανδρος Σωτήριος Κεχρής; born March 23, 1946) is a mathematician at the California Institute of Technology.

== Contributions ==
Kechris' main research interests are in mathematical logic and its interaction with other areas of mathematics. He has made extensive contributions to the definability theory of the continuum and its connections and applications to classical analysis, harmonic analysis, ergodic theory, topological dynamics, combinatorics, computability theory and model theory.

Kechris earned his Ph.D. at UCLA in 1972 under the direction of Yiannis N. Moschovakis, with a dissertation titled Projective Ordinals and Countable Analytical Sets. He was a C.L.E. Moore Instructor at MIT during 1972-1974 and has been at the California Institute of Technology since 1974. During his academic career he advised 27 PhD students and sponsored 23 postdoctoral researchers.

== Honors ==
- 1978 - A.P. Sloan Foundation Fellow.
- 1986 - Invited Speaker at the International Congress of Mathematicians in Berkeley (Mathematical Logic & Foundations)
- 1987 - Honorary Doctoral Degree from the University of Athens, Greece.
- 1998 - Visiting Miller Research Professor, U.C. Berkeley.
- 1998 - Gödel Lecture (Current Trends in Descriptive Set Theory).
- 2002 - J.S. Guggenheim Memorial Foundation Fellow.
- 2003 - Received the Karp Prize, along with Gregory Hjorth for work on Borel equivalence relations, in particular for their results on turbulence and countable Borel equivalence relations
- 2004 - Tarski Lectures (New Connections Between Logic, Ramsey Theory and Topological Dynamics)
- 2012 - Inaugural Fellow of the American Mathematical Society.
- 2017 - Trjitzinsky Memorial Lectures, University of Illinois at Urbana-Champaign (A descriptive set theoretic approach to problems in harmonic analysis, ergodic theory and combinatorics).
- 2018 - Rademacher Lectures, University of Pennsylvania (A descriptive set theoretic approach to problems in harmonic analysis, ergodic theory and combinatorics).
- 2024 - Brin Mathematics Research Center Distinguished Lecture, University of Maryland (Orbit equivalence relations and the compact action realization problem).

== Books ==
- A.S. Kechris and A. Louveau, Descriptive Set Theory and the Structure of Sets of Uniqueness, London Math.Society Lecture Note Series, 128, Cambridge University Press, 1987.
- A. S. Kechris, Classical Descriptive Set Theory, Springer-Verlag, 1995.
- H. Becker, A. S. Kechris, The descriptive set theory of Polish group actions, London Math. Society Lecture Note Series, 232, Cambridge University Press, 1996.
- A.S. Kechris and B.D. Miller, Topics in Orbit Equivalence, Lecture Notes in Mathematics, 1852, Springer, 2004.
- A. S. Kechris, Global Aspects of Ergodic Group Actions, Mathematical Surveys and Monographs, 160, American Mathematical Society, 2010.
- A. S. Kechris, The theory of countable Borel equivalence relations, Cambridge Tracts in Mathematics, 234, Cambridge University Press, 2025.
