= Richard Zach =

Canadian logician, philosopher of mathematics

- Education: University of California, Berkeley
- Scientific career
- Fields: Mathematical logic (Proof theory); Philosophical logic; History of logic; Philosophy of mathematics; History of analytic philosophy
- Workplaces: University of Calgary
- Thesis: Hilbert's Finitism: Historical and Philosophical Perspectives (2001)
- Doctoral advisors: Paolo Mancosu, Jack Silver
- Website: richardzach.org

Richard Zach is a Canadian logician, philosopher of mathematics, and historian of logic and analytic philosophy. He is currently Professor of Philosophy at the University of Calgary.

== Research ==
Zach's research interests include the development of formal logic and historical figures (Hilbert, Gödel, and Carnap) associated with this development. In the philosophy of mathematics, Zach has worked on Hilbert's program and the philosophical relevance of proof theory. In mathematical logic, he has made contributions to proof theory (epsilon calculus, proof complexity) and to modal and many-valued logic, especially Gödel logic.

== Career ==
Zach received his undergraduate education at the Vienna University of Technology and his Ph.D. at the Group in Logic and the Methodology of Science at the University of California, Berkeley. His dissertation, Hilbert's Program: Historical, Philosophical, and Metamathematical Perspectives, was jointly supervised by Paolo Mancosu and Jack Silver.

He has taught at the University of Calgary since 2001, and holds the rank of Professor. He has held visiting appointments at the University of California, Irvine and McGill University. Zach is a founding editor of the Review of Symbolic Logic and the Journal for the Study of the History of Analytic Philosophy, and is also associate editor of Studia Logica, and a subject editor for the Stanford Encyclopedia of Philosophy (History of Modern Logic). He serves on the editorial boards of the Bernays edition and the Carnap edition. He was elected to the Council of the Association for Symbolic Logic in 2008 (ASL) and he has served on the ASL Committee on Logic Education and the executive committee of the Kurt Gödel Society.
