= Joris van der Hoeven =

Dutch mathematician and computer scientist

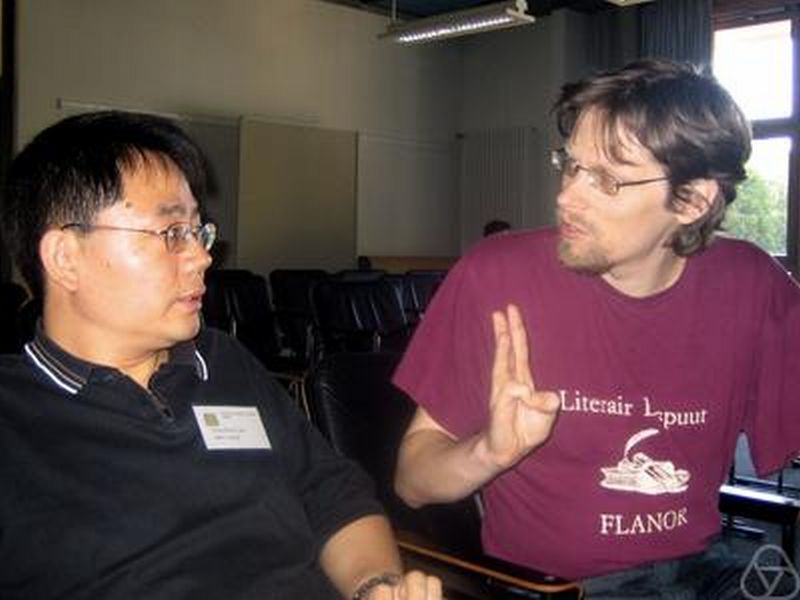
- From left: Xiao-Shan Gao, Joris van der Hoeven 2006
- Born: 1971 (age 54–55)
- Education: Paris Diderot University
- Awards: Karp Prize (2018)
- Scientific career
- Fields: Computer science, Mathematics
- Workplaces: École Polytechnique
- Thesis: Asymptotique automatique (1997)
- Doctoral advisor: Jean-Marc Steyaert

Joris van der Hoeven (born 1971) is a Dutch mathematician and computer scientist, specializing in algebraic analysis and computer algebra. He is the primary developer of GNU TeXmacs.

== Education and career ==
Joris van der Hoeven received in 1997 his doctorate from Paris Diderot University (Paris 7) with thesis Asymptotique automatique. He is a Directeur de recherche at the CNRS and head of the team Max Modélisation algébrique at the Laboratoire d'informatique of the École Polytechnique.

== Research ==
His research deals with transseries (i.e. generalizations of formal power series) with applications to algebraic analysis and asymptotic solutions of nonlinear differential equations. In addition to transseries' properties as part of differential algebra and model theory, he also examines their algorithmic aspects as well as those of classical complex function theory.

He is the main developer of GNU TeXmacs (a free scientific editing platform) and Mathemagix (free software, a computer algebra and analysis system).

In 2019, van der Hoeven and his coauthor David Harvey announced their discovery of the fastest known multiplication algorithm, allowing the multiplication of $n$-bit binary numbers in time $O(n\log n)$. Their paper was peer reviewed and published in the Annals of Mathematics in 2021.

== Recognition ==
In 2018, he was an Invited Speaker (with Matthias Aschenbrenner and Lou van den Dries) with the talk On numbers, germs, and transseries at the International Congress of Mathematicians in Rio de Janeiro. In 2018, the three received the Karp Prize. In 2022, he received the N. G. de Bruijn prize

== Selected publications ==
=== Articles ===
- van der Hoeven, Joris (1999). "Fast evaluation of holonomic functions". Theoretical Computer Science. 210: 199–215. doi:10.1016/S0304-3975(98)00102-9.
- van der Hoeven, Joris (2001). "Fast Evaluation of Holonomic Functions Near and in Regular Singularities". Journal of Symbolic Computation. 31 (6): 717–743. doi:10.1006/jsco.2000.0474. 2001
- van der Hoeven, Joris (2002). "Relax, but Don't be Too Lazy". Journal of Symbolic Computation. 34 (6): 479–542. doi:10.1006/jsco.2002.0562. 2002
- van der Hoeven, Joris (2010). "Newton's method and FFT trading". Journal of Symbolic Computation. 45 (8): 857–878. doi:10.1016/j.jsc.2010.03.005.
- Harvey, David; van der Hoeven, Joris; Lecerf, Grégoire (2016). "Even faster integer multiplication" (PDF). Journal of Complexity. 36: 1–30. arXiv:1407.3360. doi:10.1016/j.jco.2016.03.001. S2CID 205861906. 2016
- van der Hoeven, Joris; Lecerf, Grégoire; Quintin, Guillaume (2016). "Modular SIMD arithmetic in Mathemagix". ACM Transactions on Mathematical Software. 43: 1–37. arXiv:1407.3383. doi:10.1145/2876503. S2CID 10462804. 2016
- Harvey, David; van der Hoeven, Joris; Lecerf, Grégoire (2017). "Faster Polynomial Multiplication over Finite Fields" (PDF). Journal of the ACM. 63 (6): 1–23. arXiv:1407.3361. doi:10.1145/3005344. S2CID 6821515. 2017
- Harvey, David; van der Hoeven, Joris (2021). "Integer multiplication in time $O(n \log n)$" (PDF). Annals of Mathematics. Second Series. 193 (2): 563–617. doi:10.4007/annals.2021.193.2.4. MR 4224716. S2CID 109934776.

=== Books ===
- Hoeven, J. van der (2006). Transseries and real differential algebra. Berlin: Springer. ISBN 978-3-540-35591-5. OCLC 262692832.
- Aschenbrenner, Matthias; Van den Dries, Lou; Hoeven, J. van der (2017). Asymptotic differential algebra and model theory of transseries. Princeton. ISBN 978-1-4008-8541-1. OCLC 986538411.
