= Jessica Staddon =

American computer scientist

Jessica Nicola Staddon is an American computer scientist with broad research interests that include cryptography, human–computer interaction, information visualization, coding theory, and information privacy. She is a research scientist at Google, and an adjunct professor of computer science at North Carolina State University.

== Education and career ==
Staddon earned her Ph.D. in mathematics in 1997 at the University of California, Berkeley. Her dissertation, A Combinational Study of Communication, Storage and Traceability in Broadcast Encryption Systems, was supervised by Leo Harrington.

Her interests in computer science broadened through successive moves to RSA Security (1997–1999), Bell Labs (1999–2001), PARC (2001–2010), and Google, where she began working in 2010. She returned to academia as an associate professor at North Carolina State University in 2015, but later returned to Google.
