= Julia F. Knight =

American mathematician

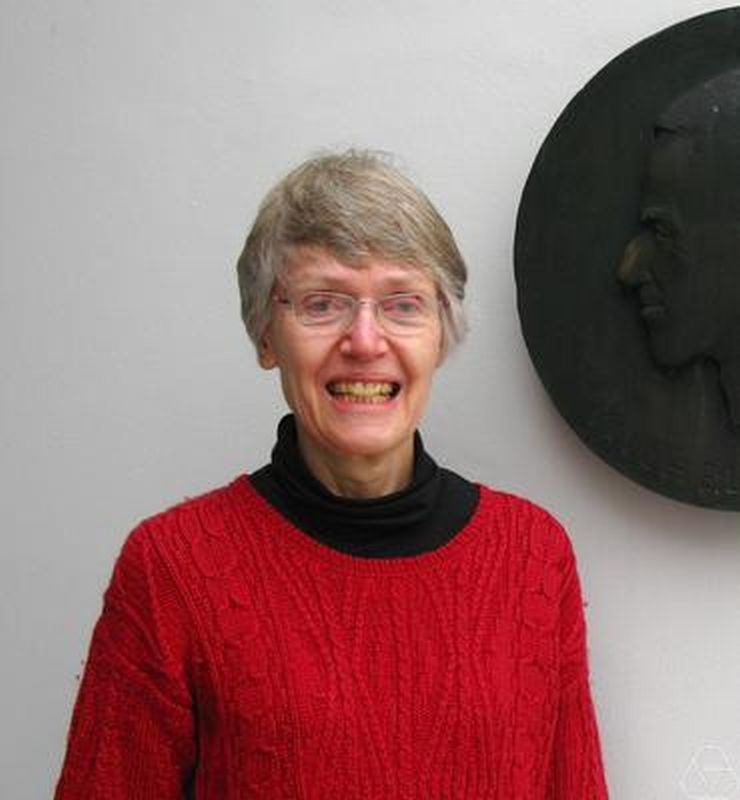
Julia F. Knight, 2012

Julia Frandsen Knight is an American mathematician, specializing in model theory and computability theory. She is the Charles L. Huisking Professor of Mathematics at the University of Notre Dame and director of the graduate program in mathematics there.

== Education ==
Knight did her undergraduate studies at Utah State University, graduating in 1964, and earned her Ph.D. from the University of California, Berkeley in 1972 under the supervision of Robert Lawson Vaught.

== Honors and awards ==
In 2012, she became a fellow of the American Mathematical Society and she was elected to be the 30th president of the Association for Symbolic Logic. She was named MSRI Simons Professor for Fall 2020.

In 2014, Knight held the Gödel Lecture, titled Computable structure theory and formulas of special forms.
