= Zilber–Pink conjecture =

Mathematical conjecture

In mathematics, the Zilber–Pink conjecture is a far-reaching generalisation of many famous Diophantine conjectures and statements, such as André–Oort, Manin–Mumford, and Mordell–Lang. For algebraic tori and semiabelian varieties it was proposed by Boris Zilber and independently by Enrico Bombieri, David Masser, Umberto Zannier in the early 2000's. For semiabelian varieties the conjecture implies the Mordell–Lang and Manin–Mumford conjectures. Richard Pink proposed (again independently) a more general conjecture for Shimura varieties which also implies the André–Oort conjecture. In the case of algebraic tori, Zilber called it the Conjecture on Intersections with Tori (CIT). The general version is now known as the Zilber–Pink conjecture. It states roughly that atypical or unlikely intersections of an algebraic variety with certain special varieties are accounted for by finitely many special varieties.

== Statement ==
=== Atypical and unlikely intersections ===
The intersection of two algebraic varieties is called atypical if its dimension is larger than expected. More precisely, given two subvarieties $X, Y \subseteq U$, a component $Z$ of the intersection $X \cap Y$ is said to be atypical in $U$ if $\dim Z > \dim X + \dim Y - \dim U$. Since the expected dimension of $X \cap Y$ is $\dim X + \dim Y - \dim U$, atypical intersections are "atypically large" and are not expected to occur. When $\dim X + \dim Y - \dim U < 0$, the varieties $X$ and $Y$ are not expected to intersect at all, so when they do, the intersection is said to be unlikely. For example, if in a 3-dimensional space two lines intersect, then it is an unlikely intersection, for two randomly chosen lines would almost never intersect.

=== Special varieties ===
Special varieties of a Shimura variety are certain arithmetically defined subvarieties. They are higher dimensional versions of special points. For example, in semiabelian varieties special points are torsion points and special varieties are translates of irreducible algebraic subgroups by torsion points. In the modular setting special points are the singular moduli and special varieties are irreducible components of varieties defined by modular equations.

Given a mixed Shimura variety $X$ and a subvariety $V \subseteq X$, an atypical subvariety of $V$ is an atypical component of an intersection $V \cap T$ where $T \subseteq X$ is a special subvariety.

=== The Zilber–Pink conjecture ===
Let $X$ be a mixed Shimura variety or a semiabelian variety defined over $\mathbb{C}$, and let $V\subseteq X$ be a subvariety. Then $V$ contains only finitely many maximal atypical subvarieties.

The abelian and modular versions of the Zilber–Pink conjecture are special cases of the conjecture for Shimura varieties, while in general the semiabelian case is not. However, special subvarieties of semiabelian and Shimura varieties share many formal properties which makes the same formulation valid in both settings.

== Partial results and special cases ==
While the Zilber–Pink conjecture is wide open, many special cases and weak versions have been proven.

If a variety $V\subseteq X$ contains a special variety $T$ then by definition $T$ is an atypical subvariety of $V$. One can then show using the Zilber-Pink conjecture and induction that $V$ contains only finitely many maximal special subvarieties. This is the Manin–Mumford conjecture in the semiabelian setting and the André–Oort conjecture in the Shimura setting. Both are now theorems; the former has been known for several decades, while the latter was proven in full generality only recently.

Many partial results have been proven on the Zilber–Pink conjecture. An example in the modular setting is the result that any variety contains only finitely many maximal strongly atypical subvarieties, where a strongly atypical subvariety is an atypical subvariety with no constant coordinate.

== See also ==
- Existential Closedness conjecture
- Schanuel's conjecture
- Boris Zilber
