= Silver machine =

Type of mathematical object

In set theory, Silver machines are devices used for bypassing the use of fine structure in proofs of statements holding in L. They were invented by set theorist Jack Silver as a means of proving global square holds in the constructible universe.

== Preliminaries ==
An ordinal $\alpha$ is *definable from a class of ordinals X if and only if there is a formula $\phi(\mu_0,\mu_1, \ldots ,\mu_n)$ and ordinals $\beta_1, \ldots , \beta_n,\gamma \in X$ such that $\alpha$ is the unique ordinal for which $\models_{L_\gamma} \phi(\alpha^\circ,\beta_1^\circ, \ldots , \beta^\circ_n)$ where for all $\alpha$ we define $\alpha^\circ$ to be the name for $\alpha$ within $L_\gamma$.

A structure $\langle X, < , (h_i)_{i<\omega} \rangle$ is eligible if and only if:

1. $X \subseteq On$.
2. < is the ordering on On restricted to X.
3. $\forall i, h_i$ is a partial function from $X^{k(i)}$ to X, for some integer k(i).

If $N=\langle X, < , (h_i)_{i<\omega} \rangle$ is an eligible structure then $N_\lambda$ is defined to be as before but with all occurrences of X replaced with $X \cap \lambda$.

Let $N^1, N^2$ be two eligible structures which have the same function k. Then we say $N^1 \triangleleft N^2$ if $\forall i \in \omega$ and $\forall x_1, \ldots , x_{k(i)} \in X^1$ we have:

$h_i^1(x_1, \ldots , x_{k(i)}) \cong h_i^2(x_1, \ldots , x_{k(i)})$

== Silver machine ==
A Silver machine is an eligible structure of the form $M=\langle On, < , (h_i)_{i<\omega} \rangle$ which satisfies the following conditions:

Condensation principle. If $N \triangleleft M_\lambda$ then there is an $\alpha$ such that $N \cong M_\alpha$.

Finiteness principle. For each $\lambda$ there is a finite set $H \subseteq \lambda$ such that for any set $A \subseteq \lambda +1$ we have

$$M_{\lambda+1}[A] \subseteq M_\lambda[(A \cap \lambda) \cup H] \cup \{\lambda\}$$

Skolem property. If $\alpha$ is *definable from the set $X \subseteq On$, then $\alpha \in M[X]$; moreover there is an ordinal $\lambda < [sup(X) \cup \alpha]^+$, uniformly $\Sigma_1$ definable from $X \cup \{\alpha\}$, such that $\alpha \in M_\lambda[X]$.
