= Virtually rank-into-rank cardinal =

Virtually rank-into-rank cardinal is the virtual version of a rank-into-rank cardinal, specifically Axiom I3. That is, the defining elementary embedding is not in V itself, but rather in a forcing extension of V. This weakens the cardinal substantially and makes it consistent with V=L.

== Strength relative to other large cardinals ==
Virtually rank-into-rank cardinal is stronger than ω-iterable cardinal, but weaker than ω-Erdos cardinal.
