= Archive for Mathematical Logic =

- Discipline: Mathematical logic
- Language: English
- Edited by: Ralf Schindler

Publication details
- Former name: Archiv für mathematische Logik und Grundlagenforschung
- History: 1950–present
- Publisher: Springer Science+Business Media
- Frequency: 8/year
- Impact factor: 0.287 (2020)

Standard abbreviations
- ISO 4: Arch. Math. Log.
- MathSciNet: Arch. Math. Logic

Indexing
- CODEN: AMLOEH
- ISSN: 0933-5846 (print); 1432-0665 (web)
- LCCN: 88645365
- OCLC no.: 18237511

Links
- Journal homepage

Archive for Mathematical Logic is a peer-reviewed mathematics journal published by Springer Science+Business Media. It was established in 1950 and publishes articles on mathematical logic.

== Abstracting and indexing ==
The journal is abstracted and indexed in:

- Mathematical Reviews
- Zentralblatt MATH
- Scopus
- SCImago

According to the Journal Citation Reports, the journal has a 2020 impact factor of 0.287.
