= Jack Silver =

American mathematician (1942–2016)

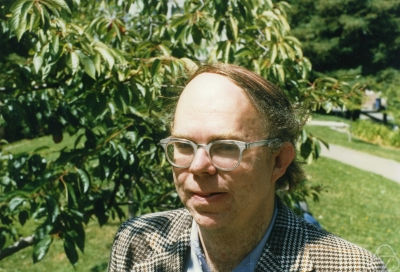
- Jack Silver in 1986 (photo by George Bergman)
- Born: Jack Howard Silver; April 23, 1942; Missoula, Montana, U.S.
- Died: December 22, 2016 (aged 74)
- Education: University of California, Berkeley
- Known for: Silver forcing
- Scientific career
- Fields: Mathematics
- Workplaces: University of California, Berkeley
- Thesis: Some Applications of Model Theory in Set Theory (1966)
- Doctoral advisor: Robert Lawson Vaught
- Doctoral students: Jeremy Avigad; John P. Burgess; Randall Dougherty; Martin Goldstern; Concha Gómez; Richard Zach

Jack Howard Silver (23 April 1942 – 22 December 2016) was an American set theorist and logician at the University of California, Berkeley. Silver made several contributions to set theory in the areas of large cardinals and the constructible universe L.

== Early life ==
Born in Montana, he earned his Ph.D. in Mathematics at Berkeley in 1966 under Robert Vaught before taking a position at the same institution the following year. He held an Alfred P. Sloan Research Fellowship from 1970 to 1972.

== Contributions ==
In his 1975 paper "On the Singular Cardinals Problem", Silver proved that if a cardinal κ is singular with uncountable cofinality and 2^{λ} = λ^{+} for all infinite cardinals λ < κ, then 2^{κ} = κ^{+}. Prior to Silver's proof, many mathematicians believed that a forcing argument would yield that the negation of the theorem is consistent with ZFC. He introduced the notion of a master condition, which became an important tool in forcing proofs involving large cardinals.

Silver proved the consistency of Chang's conjecture using the Silver collapse (which is a variation of the Levy collapse). He proved that, assuming the consistency of a supercompact cardinal, it is possible to construct a model where 2^{κ} = κ^{++} holds for some measurable cardinal κ. With the introduction of the so-called Silver machines he was able to give a fine structure free proof of Jensen's covering lemma. He is also credited with discovering Silver indiscernibles and generalizing the notion of a Kurepa tree (called Silver's Principle). He discovered 0# ("zero sharp") in his 1966 Ph.D. thesis, discussed in the graduate textbook Set Theory: An Introduction to Large Cardinals by Frank R. Drake.

Silver's original work involving large cardinals was perhaps motivated by the goal of showing the inconsistency of an uncountable measurable cardinal; instead he was led to discover indiscernibles in L assuming a measurable cardinal exists.

== Selected publications ==
- Silver, Jack H. (1971). "Some applications of model theory in set theory". Annals of Mathematical Logic 3(1), pp. 45–110.
- Silver, Jack H. (1973). "The bearing of large cardinals on constructibility". In Studies in Model Theory, MAA Studies in Mathematics 8, pp. 158–182.
- Silver, Jack H. (1974). "Indecomposable ultrafilters and 0#". In Proceedings of the Tarski Symposium, Proceedings of Symposia in Pure Mathematics XXV, pp. 357–363.
- Silver, Jack (1975). "On the singular cardinals problem". In Proceedings of the International Congress of Mathematicians 1, pp. 265–268.
- Silver, Jack H. (1980). "Counting the number of equivalence classes of Borel and coanalytic equivalence relations". Annals of Mathematical Logic 18(1), pp. 1–28.
