= Virtually extendible cardinal =

Virtually extendible cardinal is the virtual version of an extendible cardinal. That is, the defining elementary embedding is not in V itself, but rather in a forcing extension of V. This weakens the cardinal substantially and makes it consistent with V=L.

== Strength relative to other large cardinals ==
virtually extendible cardinal is stronger than 1-iterable cardinal and remarkable cardinal, but weaker than 2-iterable cardinal.
