= Boris Zilber =

British logician

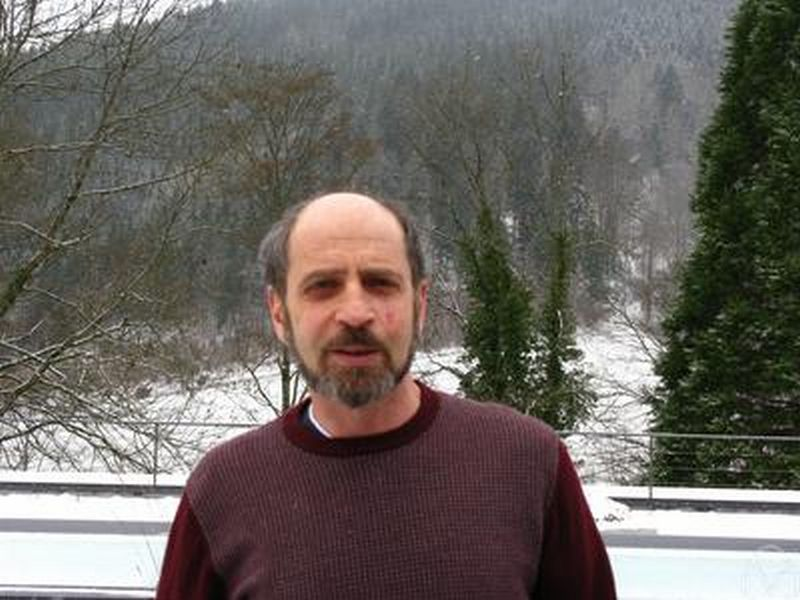
- Zilber in Oberwolfach 2010
- Born: 1949 (age 76–77); Tashkent, Uzbekistan
- Education: Novosibirsk State University; Saint Petersburg State University
- Awards: Tarski Lectures (2002) Gödel Lecture (2003) Senior Berwick Prize (2004) Pólya Prize (2015)
- Scientific career
- Fields: Mathematics, Logic, Model theory
- Workplaces: University of Oxford
- Thesis: Groups and Rings with Categorical Theories (1975)
- Doctoral advisor: Mikhail Taitslin

Boris Zilber (Russian: Борис Иосифович Зильбер, born 1949) is a Soviet-British mathematician who works in mathematical logic, specifically model theory. He is an emeritus professor of mathematical logic at the University of Oxford.

He obtained his doctorate (Candidate of Sciences) from the Novosibirsk State University in 1975 under the supervision of Mikhail Taitslin and his habilitation (Doctor of Sciences) from the Saint Petersburg State University in 1986.

Zilber received the Senior Berwick Prize (2004) and the Pólya Prize (2015) from the London Mathematical Society. He also gave the Tarski Lectures in 2002.

== Research ==
Zilber is well known for his seminal work around several fundamental problems in mathematics, mostly in the broad area of geometric model theory. In particular, his trichotomy conjecture on the nature of strongly minimal sets has been extremely influential in geometric stability theory. Although it is false in full generality (refuted by Ehud Hrushovski), it holds in many important settings, e.g. Zariski geometries, and has been successfully applied to several problems including the Mordell-Lang conjecture for function fields. Zilber's work on model theory of complex exponentiation led him to propose several influential conjectures including the Quasiminimality conjecture, the Existential Closedness conjecture, and the Conjecture on Intersections with Tori.

== See also ==
- Zilber–Pink conjecture
- Existential Closedness conjecture
- Schanuel's conjecture
