= Deborah A. Nolan =

American statistician and statistics educator

Deborah A. Nolan is an American statistician and statistics educator. She is a professor of statistics at the University of California, Berkeley, where she chairs the department of statistics.

== Education and career ==
Nolan graduated from Vassar College in 1977; she gained her first experience in statistics in a summer job at Vassar, doing statistical analyses for author Caroline Bird. After graduating, she began working as an applications programmer for IBM. Needing to learn more statistics for her work, she studied at Columbia University for a year, and then entered full-time graduate study in statistics at Yale University. At Yale, the applied side of her research included work confirming the logarithmic spiral shape of snail shells. Her dissertation, supervised by David Pollard, concerned central limit theorems, and was titled U-Processes. She completed her Ph.D. in 1986, and became a faculty member at Berkeley in the same year, the first new female regular-rank faculty member in the department since Elizabeth Scott in 1951.

== Books ==
Nolan is the author of several statistics books:

- Stat Labs: Mathematical Statistics Through Applications (with Terry Speed, Springer, 2000)
- Teaching Statistics: A Bag of Tricks (with Andrew Gelman, Oxford University Press, 2002)
- XML and Web Technologies for Data Sciences with R (with Duncan Temple Lang, Springer, 2014)
- Data Science in R: A Case Studies Approach to Computational Reasoning and Problem Solving (with Duncan Temple Lang, CRC Press, 2015)

== Recognition ==
She is a fellow of the American Statistical Association and of the Institute of Mathematical Statistics.
