= Thomas W. Scanlon =

American mathematician

Thomas Warren Scanlon is an American mathematician known for his work in model theory. He was selected for the Gödel Lecture in 2024.

== Education and career ==
Scanlon studied mathematics at the University of Chicago, earning a bachelor’s degree in 1993, and obtained his Ph.D. at Harvard University in 1997 under Ehud Hrushovski. His thesis was titled Model Theory of Valued D-Fields with Applications to Diophantine Approximations in Algebraic Groups. He is a professor at the University of California, Berkeley.

His work lies in mathematical logic—particularly Model theory—with applications to number theory and arithmetic geometry (including the André–Oort conjecture) and in algebra and Differential algebra.

In 2006, Scanlon was an invited speaker at the International Congress of Mathematicians in Madrid, speaking on Analytic difference rings.

In 2024, Scanlon was selected for the Gödel Lecture.

== Selected publications ==
In addition to the works cited in the footnotes:

- A model complete theory of valued D-fields. In: Journal of Symbolic Logic, vol. 65, 2000, pp. 1758–1784.
- with Jan Krajicek: Combinatorics with definable sets: Euler characteristics and Grothendieck rings. In: Bulletin of Symbolic Logic, vol. 6, 2000, pp. 311–330.
- Diophantine geometry from model theory. In: Bulletin of Symbolic Logic, vol. 7, 2001, pp. 37–57.
- A Euclidean Skolem–Mahler–Lech–Chabauty method. In: Math. Res. Lett., vol. 18, 2011, pp. 833–842.
- with Itay Kaplan, Frank Wagner: Artin–Schreier extensions in NIP and simple fields. In: Israel J. Math., vol. 185, 2011, pp. 141–153. ArXiv
- with Rahim Moosa: Generalized Hasse–Schmidt varieties and their jet spaces. In: Proc. Lond. Math. Soc., vol. 103, 2011, pp. 197–234. ArXiv
- with Dragoș Ghioca: Algebraic equations on the adèlic closure of a Drinfeld module. In: Israel J. Math., vol. 194, 2013, pp. 461–483. ArXiv
- Counting special points: Logic, diophantine geometry, and transcendence theory. In: Bulletin of the AMS, vol. 49, 2012, pp. 51–71. Online
- with R. Benedetto, D. Ghioca, B. Hutz, P. Kurlberg, T. Tucker: Periods of rational maps modulo primes. In: Mathematische Annalen, vol. 355, 2013, pp. 637–660. ArXiv
- with Alice Medvedev: Invariant varieties for polynomial dynamical systems. In: Annals of Mathematics, vol. 179, 2014, pp. 81–177. Online
- with Yu Yasufuku: Exponential-polynomial equations and dynamical return sets. In: Int. Math. Res. Notes, 2013. ArXiv
- O-minimality. In: Gazette des mathématiciens, no. 149, July 2016.
- with James Freitag: Strong minimality and the –function. In: Journal of the European Mathematical Society, vol. 20, 2017, pp. 119–136. ArXiv
