= Leo Harrington =

American mathematician

Leo A. Harrington
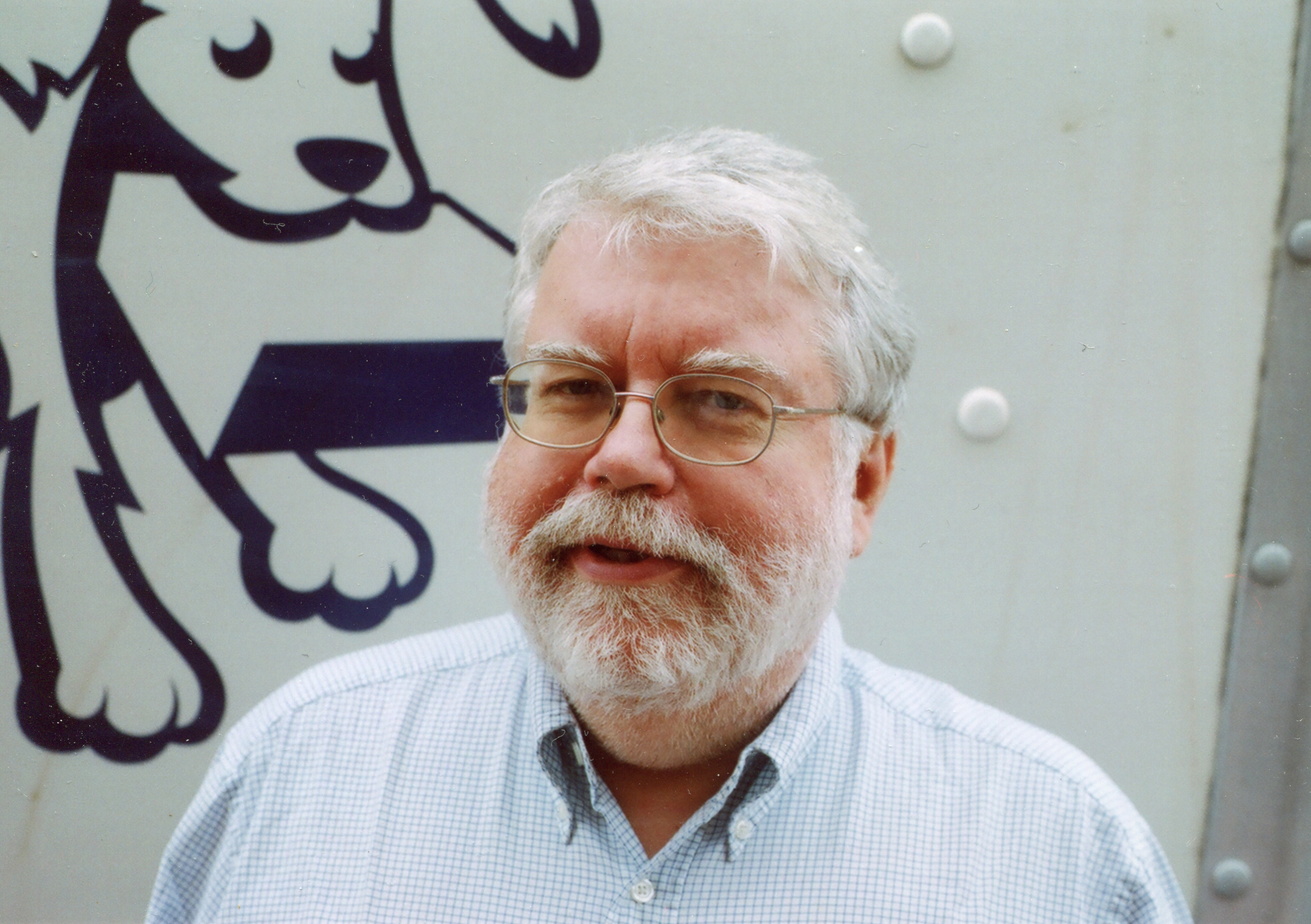
- Born: May 17, 1946 (age 80)
- Citizenship: United States
- Education: MIT
- Awards: Gödel Lecture (1995)
- Scientific career
- Fields: Mathematics
- Workplaces: University of California, Berkeley
- Doctoral advisor: Gerald E. Sacks
- Doctoral students: María Luisa Bonet; Concha Gómez; Ehud Hrushovski; Jessica Staddon

Leo Anthony Harrington (born May 17, 1946) is a professor of mathematics at the University of California, Berkeley who works in computability theory, model theory, and set theory.

His notable results include proving the Paris–Harrington theorem along with Jeff Paris, showing that if the axiom of determinacy holds for all analytic sets then x^{#} exists for all reals x, and proving with Saharon Shelah that the first-order theory of the partially ordered set of computably enumerable Turing degrees is undecidable.
