= Ramsey cardinal =

Mathematical concept

In mathematics, a Ramsey cardinal is a certain kind of large cardinal number introduced by Erdős & Hajnal (1962) and named after Frank P. Ramsey, whose theorem, called Ramsey's theorem establishes that ω enjoys a certain property that Ramsey cardinals generalize to the uncountable case.

Let [κ]^{<ω} denote the set of all finite subsets of κ. A cardinal number κ is called Ramsey if, for every function

f: [κ]^{<ω} → {0, 1}

there is a set A of cardinality κ that is homogeneous for f. That is, for every n, the function f is constant on the subsets of cardinality n from A. A cardinal κ is called ineffably Ramsey if A can be chosen to be a stationary subset of κ. A cardinal κ is called virtually Ramsey if for every function

f: [κ]^{<ω} → {0, 1}

there is C, a closed and unbounded subset of κ, so that for every λ in C of uncountable cofinality, there is an unbounded subset of λ that is homogenous for f; slightly weaker is the notion of almost Ramsey where homogenous sets for f are required of order type λ, for every λ < κ.

The existence of any of these kinds of Ramsey cardinal is sufficient to prove the existence of 0^{#}, or indeed that every set with rank less than κ has a sharp. This in turn implies the falsity of the Axiom of Constructibility of Kurt Gödel.

Every measurable cardinal is a Ramsey cardinal, and every Ramsey cardinal is a Rowbottom cardinal.

A property intermediate in strength between Ramseyness and measurability is existence of a κ-complete normal non-principal ideal I on κ such that for every A ∉ I and for every function

f: [κ]^{<ω} → {0, 1}

there is a set B ⊂ A not in I that is homogeneous for f. This is strictly stronger than κ being ineffably Ramsey.

== Definition by κ-models ==
A regular cardinal κ is Ramsey if and only if for any set A ⊂ κ, there is a transitive set M ⊨ ZFC^{−} (i.e. ZFC without the axiom of powerset) of size κ with A ∈ M, and a nonprincipal ultrafilter U on the Boolean algebra P(κ) ∩ M such that:

- U is an M-ultrafilter: for any sequence ⟨X_{β} : β < κ⟩ ∈ M of members of U, the diagonal intersection ΔX_{β} = {α < κ : ∀β < α(α ∈ X_{β})} ∈ U,
- U is weakly amenable: for any sequence ⟨X_{β} : β < κ⟩ ∈ M of subsets of κ, the set {β < κ : X_{β} ∈ U} ∈ M, and
- U is σ-complete: the intersection of any countable family of members of U is again in U.

== Bibliography ==
- Drake, F. R. (1974). Set Theory: An Introduction to Large Cardinals (Studies in Logic and the Foundations of Mathematics; V. 76). Elsevier Science Ltd. ISBN 0-444-10535-2.
- Erdős, Paul; Hajnal, András (1962), "Some remarks concerning our paper On the structure of set-mappings. Non-existence of a two-valued σ-measure for the first uncountable inaccessible cardinal", Acta Mathematica Academiae Scientiarum Hungaricae, 13 (1–2): 223–226, doi:10.1007/BF02033641, ISSN 0001-5954, MR 0141603, S2CID 121179872
- Kanamori, Akihiro (2003). The Higher Infinite : Large Cardinals in Set Theory from Their Beginnings (2nd ed.). Springer. ISBN 3-540-00384-3.
