= Ilijas Farah =

Canadian-Serbian mathematician and professor of mathematics

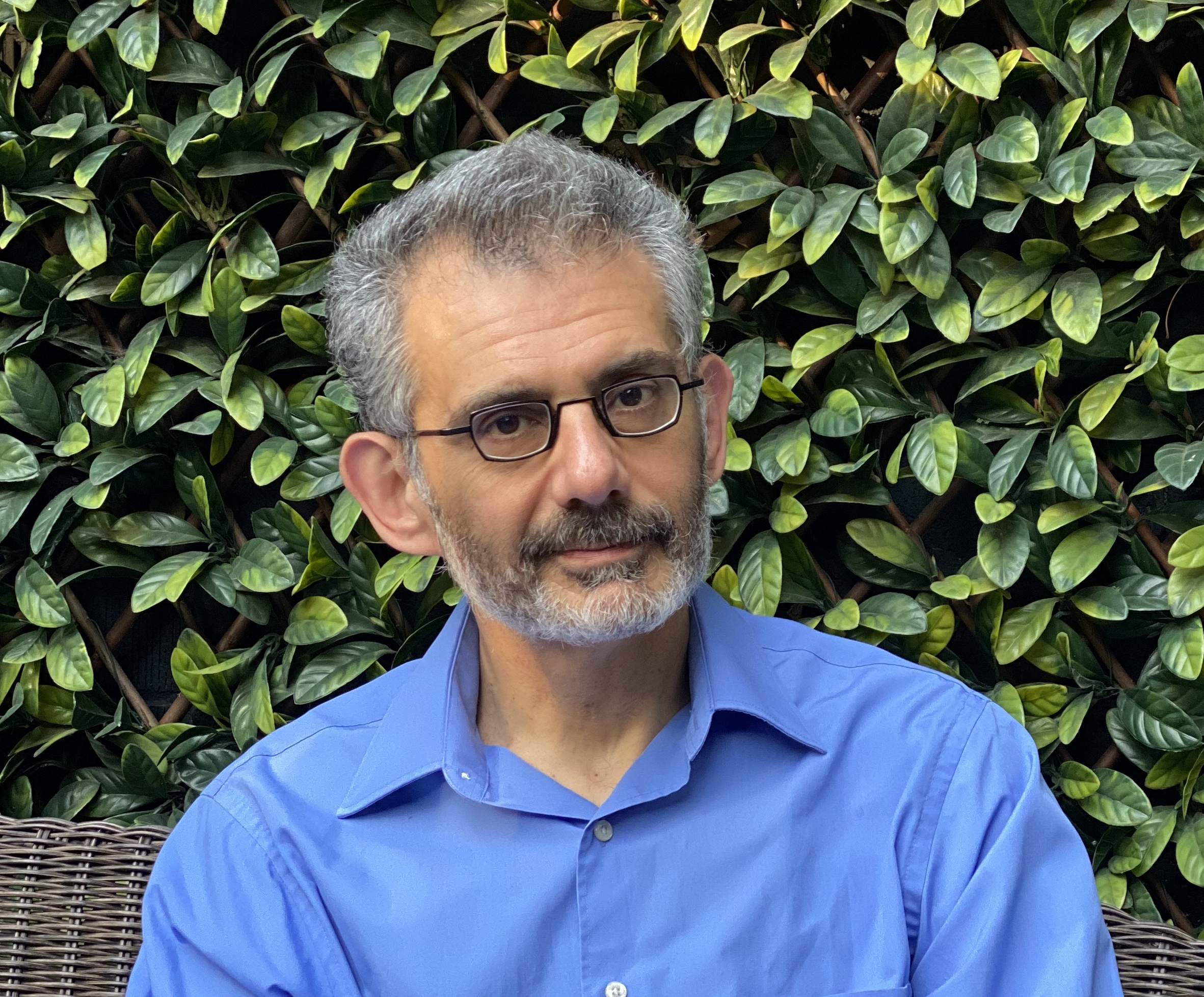
Ilijas Farah in 2020

Ilijas Farah (born 18 February 1966) is a Canadian-Serbian mathematician and a professor of mathematics at York University in Toronto and at the Mathematical Institute of Serbian Academy of Sciences and Arts, Belgrade, Serbia. His research focuses on applications of logic to operator algebras.

== Career ==
Farah was born in Sremska Mitrovica, Serbia. He received his BSc and MSc in 1988 and 1992 respectively from Belgrade University and his PhD in 1997 from the University of Toronto.

He is a Research Chair in Logic and Operator Algebras at York University, Toronto. Before moving to York University he was an NSERC Postdoctoral Fellow, York University (1997–99), a Hill Assistant Professor at Rutgers University (1999–2000), and a professor at CUNY–Graduate center and College of Staten Island (2000–02).

Farah was an invited speaker at the International Congress of Mathematicians, Seoul 2014, section on Logic and Foundations, where he presented his work on applications of logic to operator algebras.

== Awards, distinctions, and recognitions ==
- Sacks prize for the best doctorate in Mathematical Logic, 1997
- Governor General's gold medal for one of the two best doctorates at the University of Toronto, 1998
- The Canadian Association for Graduate Studies/University Microfilms International Distinguished Dissertation Award, for the best dissertation in engineering, medicine and the natural sciences in Canada, 1998.
- Dean's award for outstanding research, York University, 2006.
- Faculty Excellence in Research Award (Established Research Award), Faculty of Science, York University, 2017
