= Theodore Slaman =

American mathematician (born 1954)

Theodore Allen Slaman
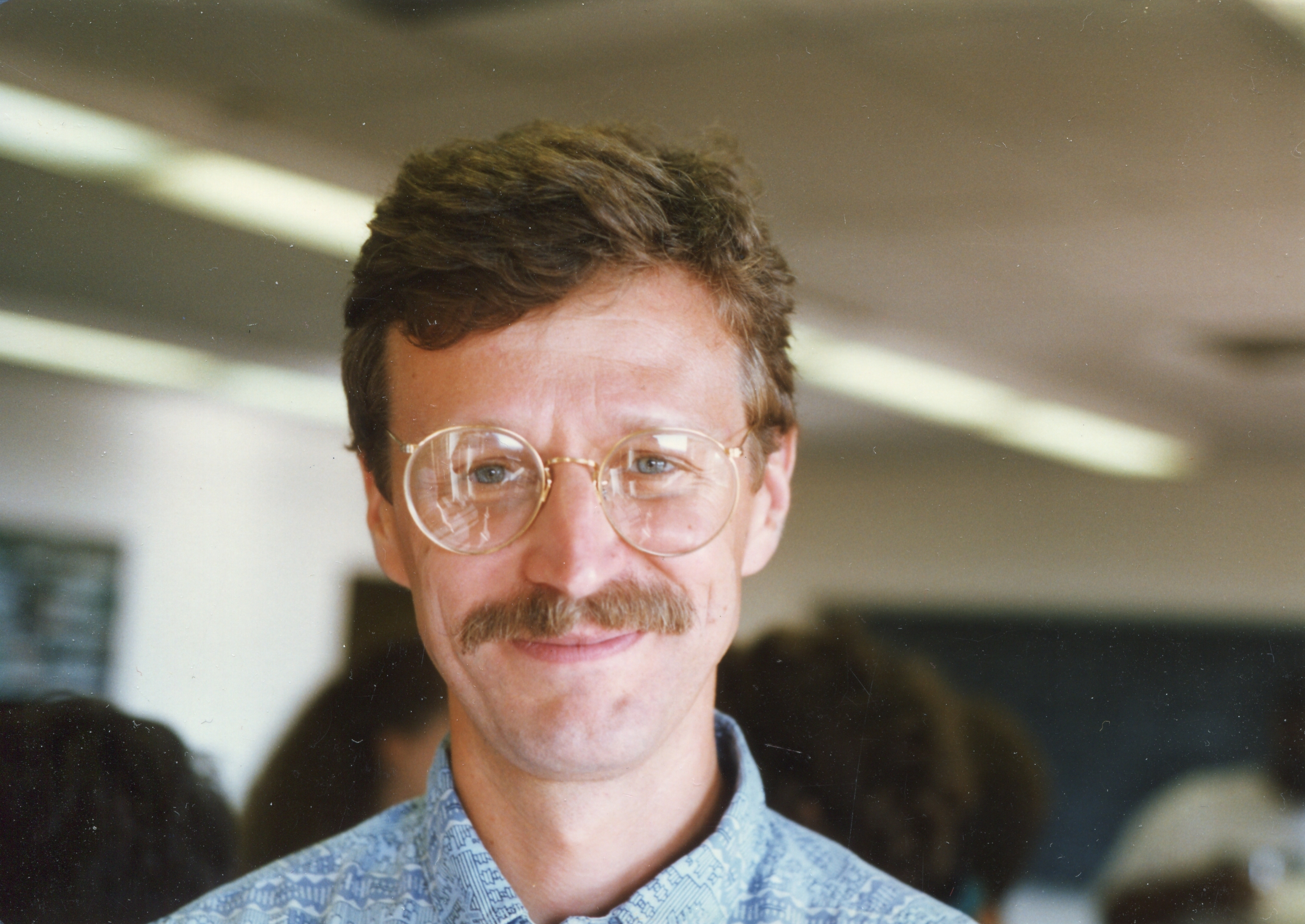
- Born: April 17, 1954 (age 72)
- Citizenship: American
- Education: Harvard University
- Scientific career
- Fields: Mathematics
- Workplaces: University of California, Berkeley
- Doctoral advisor: Gerald E. Sacks

Theodore Allen Slaman (born April 17, 1954) is a professor of mathematics at the University of California, Berkeley who works in recursion theory.

Slaman and W. Hugh Woodin formulated the Bi-interpretability Conjecture for the Turing degrees, which conjectures that the partial order of the Turing degrees is logically equivalent to second-order arithmetic. They showed that the Bi-interpretability Conjecture is equivalent to there being no nontrivial automorphism of the Turing degrees. They also exhibited limits on the possible automorphisms of the Turing degrees by showing that any automorphism will be arithmetically definable.
