= Patricia Blanchette =

American philosopher and logician

Patricia A. Blanchette is an American philosopher and logician, the McMahon-Hank Professor of Philosophy at the University of Notre Dame. She specializes in the history of philosophy, history of logic, philosophy of logic, philosophy of mathematics, and philosophy of science, and is the author of a book on the logic of Gottlob Frege.

== Education and career ==
Blanchette majored in philosophy at the University of California, San Diego, and completed her Ph.D. in philosophy at Stanford University. Her 1990 dissertation, Logicism Reconsidered, was supervised by John Etchemendy.

She became an assistant professor at Yale University in 1990, and moved to the University of Notre Dame in 1993. There, she has been full professor since 2012. From 2017 to 2020 she held the Glynn Family Honors Collegiate Chair, and in 2020 she was given the McMahon-Hank Chair of Philosophy.

== Book ==
Blanchette is the author of Frege's Conception of Logic (Oxford University Press, 2012), on the logic of Gottlob Frege. A special issue of the Journal for the History of Analytic Philosophy was dedicated as a symposium on this book.
