= Ω-logic =

Deductive system in set theory

In set theory, Ω-logic is an infinitary logic and deductive system proposed by W. Hugh Woodin (1999) as part of an attempt to generalize the theory of determinacy of pointclasses to cover the structure $H_{\aleph_2}$. Just as the axiom of projective determinacy yields a canonical theory of $H_{\aleph_1}$, he sought to find axioms that would give a canonical theory for the larger structure. The theory he developed involves a controversial argument that the continuum hypothesis is false.

== Analysis ==
Woodin's Ω-conjecture asserts that if there is a proper class of Woodin cardinals (for technical reasons, most results in the theory are most easily stated under this assumption), then Ω-logic satisfies an analogue of the completeness theorem. From this conjecture, it can be shown that, if there is any single axiom which is comprehensive over $H_{\aleph_2}$ (in Ω-logic), it must imply that the continuum is not $\aleph_1$. Woodin also isolated a specific axiom, a variation of Martin's maximum, which states that any Ω-consistent $\Pi_2$ (over $H_{\aleph_2}$) sentence is true; this axiom implies that the continuum is $\aleph_2$.

Woodin also related his Ω-conjecture to a proposed abstract definition of large cardinals: he took a "large cardinal property" to be a $\Sigma_2$ property $P(\alpha)$ of ordinals which implies that α is a strong inaccessible, and which is invariant under forcing by sets of cardinal less than α. Then the Ω-conjecture implies that if there are arbitrarily large models containing a large cardinal, this fact will be provable in Ω-logic.

The theory involves a definition of Ω-validity: a statement is an Ω-valid consequence of a set theory T if it holds in every model of T having the form $V^\mathbb{B}_\alpha$ for some ordinal $\alpha$ and some forcing notion $\mathbb{B}$. This notion is clearly preserved under forcing, and in the presence of a proper class of Woodin cardinals it will also be invariant under forcing (in other words, Ω-satisfiability is preserved under forcing as well). There is also a notion of Ω-provability; here the "proofs" consist of universally Baire sets and are checked by verifying that for every countable transitive model of the theory, and every forcing notion in the model, the generic extension of the model (as calculated in V) contains the "proof", restricted its own reals. For a proof-set A the condition to be checked here is called "A-closed". A complexity measure can be given on the proofs by their ranks in the Wadge hierarchy. Woodin showed that this notion of "provability" implies Ω-validity for sentences which are $\Pi_2$ over V. The Ω-conjecture states that the converse of this result also holds. In all currently known core models, it is known to be true; moreover the consistency strength of the large cardinals corresponds to the least proof-rank required to "prove" the existence of the cardinals.
