= Zero sharp =

Concept in set theory

In the mathematical discipline of set theory, 0^{#} (zero sharp, also 0#) is the set of true formulae about indiscernibles and order-indiscernibles in the Gödel constructible universe. It is often encoded as a subset of the natural numbers (using Gödel numbering), or as a subset of the hereditarily finite sets, or as a real number. Its existence is unprovable in ZFC, the standard form of axiomatic set theory, but follows from a suitable large cardinal axiom. It was first introduced as a set of formulae in Silver's 1966 thesis, later published as Silver (1971), where it was denoted by Σ, and rediscovered by Solovay (1967, p.52), who considered it as a subset of the natural numbers and introduced the notation O^{#} (with a capital letter O; this later changed to the numeral '0').

Roughly speaking, if 0^{#} exists then the universe V of sets is much larger than the universe L of constructible sets, while if it does not exist then the universe of all sets is closely approximated by the constructible sets.

== Definition ==
Zero sharp was defined by Silver and Solovay as follows. Consider the language of set theory with extra constant symbols $c_1$, $c_2$, ... for each nonzero natural number. Then $0^\sharp$ is defined to be the set of Gödel numbers of the true sentences about the constructible universe, with $c_i$ interpreted as the uncountable cardinal $\aleph_i$. (Here $\aleph_i$ means $\aleph_i$ in the full universe, not the constructible universe.)

There is a subtlety about this definition: by Tarski's undefinability theorem it is not, in general, possible to define the truth of a formula of set theory in the language of set theory. To solve this, Silver and Solovay assumed the existence of a suitable large cardinal, such as a Ramsey cardinal, and showed that with this extra assumption it is possible to define the truth of statements about the constructible universe. More generally, the definition of $0^\sharp$ works provided that there is an uncountable set of indiscernibles for some $L_\alpha$, and the phrase "$0^\sharp$ exists" is used as a shorthand way of saying this.

A closed set $I$ of order-indiscernibles for $L_\alpha$ (where $\alpha$ is a limit ordinal) is a set of Silver indiscernibles if:

- $I$ is unbounded in $\alpha$, and
- if $I\cap\beta$ is unbounded in an ordinal $\beta$, then the Skolem hull of $I\cap\beta$ in $L_\beta$ is $L_\beta$. In other words, every $x\in L_\beta$ is definable in $L_\beta$ from parameters in $I\cap\beta$.

If there is a set of Silver indiscernibles for $L_{\omega_1}$, then it is unique. Additionally, for any uncountable cardinal $\kappa$ there will be a unique set of Silver indiscernibles for $L_\kappa$. The union of all these sets will be a proper class $I$ of Silver indiscernibles for the structure $L$ itself. Then, $0^\sharp$ is defined as the set of all Gödel numbers of formulae $\theta$ such that

$L_\alpha\models\theta(\alpha_1,\alpha_2,\ldots,\alpha_n)$

where $\alpha_1 < \alpha_2 < \ldots < \alpha_n < \alpha$ is any strictly increasing sequence of members of $I$. Because they are indiscernibles, the definition does not depend on the choice of sequence.

Any $\alpha\in I$ has the property that $L_\alpha\prec L$. This allows for a definition of truth for the constructible universe:

$L\models\varphi(x_1,...,x_n)$ only if $L_\alpha\models\varphi(x_1,...,x_n)$ for some $\alpha\in I$.

There are several minor variations of the definition of $0^\sharp$, which make no significant difference to its properties. There are many different choices of Gödel numbering, and $0^\sharp$ depends on this choice. Instead of being considered as a subset of the natural numbers, it is also possible to encode $0^\sharp$ as a subset of formulae of a language, or as a subset of the hereditarily finite sets, or as a real number.

== Statements implying existence ==
The condition about the existence of a Ramsey cardinal implying that $0^\sharp$ exists can be weakened. The existence of $\omega_1$-Erdős cardinals implies the existence of $0^\sharp$. This is close to being best possible, because the existence of $0^\sharp$ implies that in the constructible universe there is an $\alpha$-Erdős cardinal for all countable $\alpha$, so such cardinals cannot be used to prove the existence of $0^\sharp$.

Chang's conjecture implies the existence of $0^\sharp$.

== Statements equivalent to existence ==
Kenneth Kunen showed that $0^\sharp$ exists if and only if there exists a non-trivial elementary embedding of the Gödel constructible universe $L$ into itself.

Donald A. Martin and Leo Harrington have shown that the existence of $0^\sharp$ is equivalent to the determinacy of lightface analytic games. In fact, the strategy for a universal lightface analytic game has the same Turing degree as $0^\sharp$.

It follows from Jensen's covering theorem that the existence of $0^\sharp$ is equivalent to $\omega_\omega$ of V being a regular cardinal in the constructible universe $L$.

Silver showed that the existence of an uncountable set of indiscernibles in the constructible universe is equivalent to the existence of $0^\sharp$.

== Consequences of existence and non-existence ==
The existence of $0^\sharp$ implies that every uncountable cardinal in the set-theoretic universe $V$ is an indiscernible in $L$ and satisfies all large cardinal axioms that are realized in $L$ (such as being totally ineffable). It follows that the existence of $0^\sharp$ contradicts the axiom of constructibility: $V=L$.

If $0^\sharp$ exists, then it is an example of a non-constructible $\Delta^1_3$ set of natural numbers. This is in some sense the simplest possibility for a non-constructible set, since all $\Sigma^1_2$ and $\Pi^1_2$ sets of natural numbers are constructible.

On the other hand, if $0^\sharp$ does not exist, then the constructible universe $L$ is the core model—that is, the canonical inner model that approximates the large cardinal structure of the universe considered. In that case, Jensen's covering lemma holds:

For every uncountable set $x$ of ordinals there is a constructible $y$ such that $x\subseteq y$ and $y$ has the same cardinality as $x$.

This deep result is due to Ronald Jensen. Using forcing it is easy to see that the condition that $x$ is uncountable cannot be removed. For example, consider Namba forcing, that preserves $\omega_1$ and collapses $\omega_2$ to an ordinal of cofinality $\omega$. Let $G$ be an $\omega$-sequence cofinal on $\omega_2^L$ and generic over $L$. Then no set in $L$ of $L$-size smaller than $\omega_2^L$ (which is uncountable in $V$, since $\omega_1$ is preserved) can cover $G$, since $\omega_2$ is a regular cardinal.

If $0^\sharp$ does not exist, it also follows that the singular cardinals hypothesis holds.^{p. 20}

== Other sharps ==
If $x$ is any set, then $x^\sharp$ is defined analogously to $0^\sharp$ except that one uses $L[x]$ instead of $L$, also with a predicate symbol for $x$. See Constructible universe#Relative constructibility.

== See also ==
- 0^{†}, a set similar to 0^{#} where the constructible universe is replaced by a larger inner model with a measurable cardinal.
