= Journal of Symbolic Logic =

- Discipline: Mathematical logic
- Language: English, French
- Edited by: Alessandro Berarducci

Publication details
- History: 1936–present
- Publisher: Association for Symbolic Logic
- Frequency: Quarterly
- Impact factor: 0.631 (2009)

Standard abbreviations
- ISO 4: J. Symb. Log.

Indexing
- CODEN: JSYLA6
- ISSN: 0022-4812 (print); 1943-5886 (web)
- LCCN: 41000486
- JSTOR: 00224812
- OCLC no.: 01782331

Links
- Journal homepage; Online access

The Journal of Symbolic Logic is a peer-reviewed mathematics journal published quarterly by Association for Symbolic Logic. It was established in 1936 and covers mathematical logic. The journal is indexed by Mathematical Reviews, Zentralblatt MATH, and Scopus. Its 2009 MCQ was 0.28, and its 2009 impact factor was 0.631.
