= Ehud Hrushovski =

Israeli mathematician (born 1959)

Ehud Hrushovski FRS
- אהוד הרושובסקי
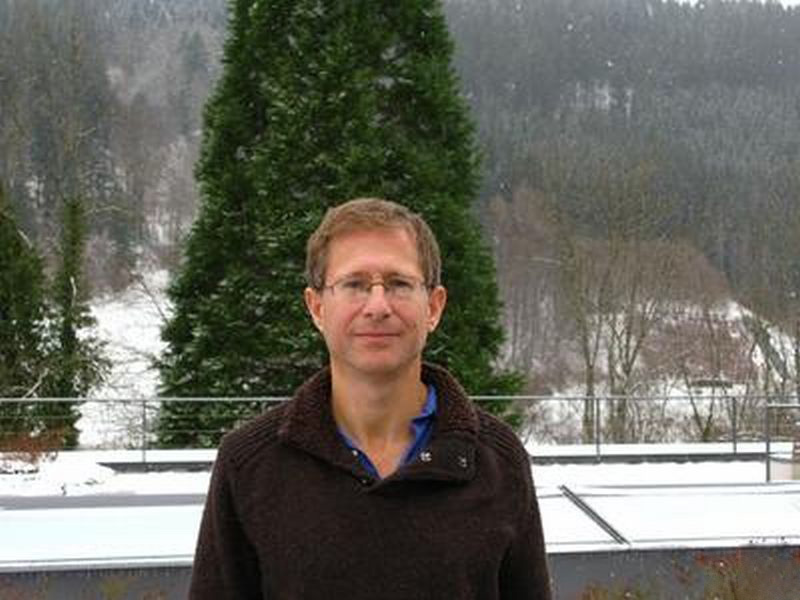
- Born: 1959 (age 66–67)
- Known for: Model theory; Hrushovski construction
- Awards: Shaw Prize (2022)
- Scientific career
- Institutions: University of Oxford; Hebrew University; Massachusetts Institute of Technology
- Thesis: Contributions to stable model theory
- Academic advisors: Leo Harrington

Ehud Hrushovski FRS (Hebrew: אהוד הרושובסקי; born 30 September 1959) is a mathematical logician. He is a Merton Professor of Mathematical Logic at the University of Oxford and a Fellow of Merton College, Oxford. He was also Professor of Mathematics at the Hebrew University of Jerusalem.

== Early life and education ==
Hrushovski's father, Benjamin Harshav, was a literary theorist, a Yiddish and Hebrew poet and a translator, professor at Yale University and Tel Aviv University in comparative literature. Ehud Hrushovski earned his PhD from the University of California, Berkeley in 1986 under Leo Harrington; his dissertation was titled Contributions to Stable Model Theory. He was a professor of mathematics at the Massachusetts Institute of Technology until 1994, when he became a professor at the Hebrew University of Jerusalem. Hrushovski moved in 2017 to the University of Oxford, where he is the Merton Professor of Mathematical Logic.

== Career ==
Hrushovski is well known for several fundamental contributions to model theory, in particular in the branch that has become known as geometric model theory, and its applications. His PhD thesis revolutionized stable model theory (a part of model theory arising from the stability theory introduced by Saharon Shelah). Shortly afterwards he found counterexamples to the Trichotomy Conjecture of Boris Zilber and his method of proof has become well known as Hrushovski constructions and found many other applications since.

One of his most famous results is his proof of the geometric Mordell–Lang conjecture in all characteristics using model theory in 1996. This deep proof was a landmark in logic and geometry. He has had many other famous and notable results in model theory and its applications to geometry, algebra, and combinatorics.

=== Honours and awards ===
He was an invited speaker at the 1990 International Congress of Mathematicians and a plenary speaker at the 1998 ICM. He is a recipient of the Erdős Prize of the Israel Mathematical Union in 1994, the Rothschild Prize in 1998, the Karp Prize of the Association for Symbolic Logic in 1993 (jointly with Alex Wilkie) and again in 1998, In 2007, he was honored with holding the Gödel Lecture. In his absence, a lecture on his work titled Algebraic Model Theory was given by Thomas Scanlon. In 2019 he was awarded the Heinz Hopf Prize and in 2022 the Shaw Prize in Mathematical Sciences.

Hrushovski is a fellow of the American Academy of Arts and Sciences (2007), and Israel Academy of Sciences and Humanities (2008). He was elected a Fellow of the Royal Society in 2020.
