= W. Hugh Woodin =

American mathematician (born 1955)

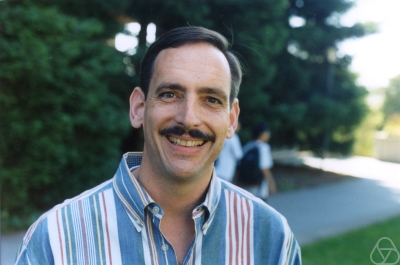
- Hugh Woodin in 1994
- Born: April 23, 1955 (age 71); Tucson, Arizona, U.S.
- Education: California Institute of Technology (BS); University of California, Berkeley (PhD)
- Known for: Woodin cardinals, Ultimate L, Ω-logic
- Scientific career
- Fields: Mathematics
- Workplaces: California Institute of Technology; University of California, Berkeley; Harvard University
- Thesis: Discontinuous Homomorphisms of C(Ω) and Set Theory (1984)
- Doctoral advisor: Robert M. Solovay
- Doctoral students: Joel David Hamkins; Gregory Hjorth; Joan Bagaria; Sandra Müller

William Hugh Woodin (born April 23, 1955) is an American mathematician at Harvard University specializing in set theory. He has made many notable contributions to the theory of inner models and determinacy. A type of large cardinals, the Woodin cardinals, bears his name. In 2023, he was elected to the National Academy of Sciences.

== Biography ==
William Hugh Woodin was born on April 23, 1955, in Tucson, Arizona to Ann (nee Snow) and William Woodin III, the grandson of United States Secretary of the Treasury William Hartman Woodin. Hugh's father was the executive director of the Arizona-Sonora Desert Museum.

Woodin earned a BS from the California Institute of Technology in 1977 followed by a Ph.D. from the University of California, Berkeley, in 1984 under Robert M. Solovay. His dissertation title was Discontinuous Homomorphisms of C(Ω) and Set Theory.

In 1985, Woodin joined the Caltech faculty as a full professor and remained there until 1988 when he left for UC Berkeley.

He served as chair of the Berkeley mathematics department for the 2002–2003 academic year. Woodin is a managing editor of the Journal of Mathematical Logic. In 2015, Woodin retires from Berkeley and moves to Harvard.

He was elected a Fellow of the American Academy of Arts and Sciences in 2000.

He is the great-grandson of William Hartman Woodin, former Secretary of the Treasury.

== Work ==
Woodin's earliest mathematical work concerned a connection between set theory and the theory of Banach algebras. In the 1980s he made major contributions in the study of the Axiom of Determinacy (AD) via inner model theory, culminating in determining the precise consistency strength of AD relative to the standard large cardinal hierarchy.

Woodin has done work on the theory of generic multiverses and the related concept of Ω-logic, which suggested an argument that the continuum hypothesis is either undecidable or false in the sense of mathematical platonism. Woodin criticizes this view arguing that it leads to a counterintuitive reduction in which all truths in the set theoretical universe can be decided from a small part of it. He claims that these and related mathematical results lead (intuitively) to the conclusion that the continuum hypothesis has a truth value and the Platonistic approach is reasonable.

Woodin now predicts that there should be a way of constructing an inner model for almost all known large cardinals, which he calls the Ultimate L and which would have similar properties as Gödel's constructible universe. In particular, the continuum hypothesis would be true in this universe.

== Honors ==
In 2008, Woodin gave the Gödel Lecture titled The Continuum Hypothesis, the Conjecture, and the inner model problem of one supercompact cardinal. In 2010, he was a plenary speaker at the International Congress of Mathematicians in Hyderabad. In 2018, he was the Tarski lecturer.

== See also ==
- AD+
