= Angus Macintyre =

British mathematician and logician

Angus MacIntyre
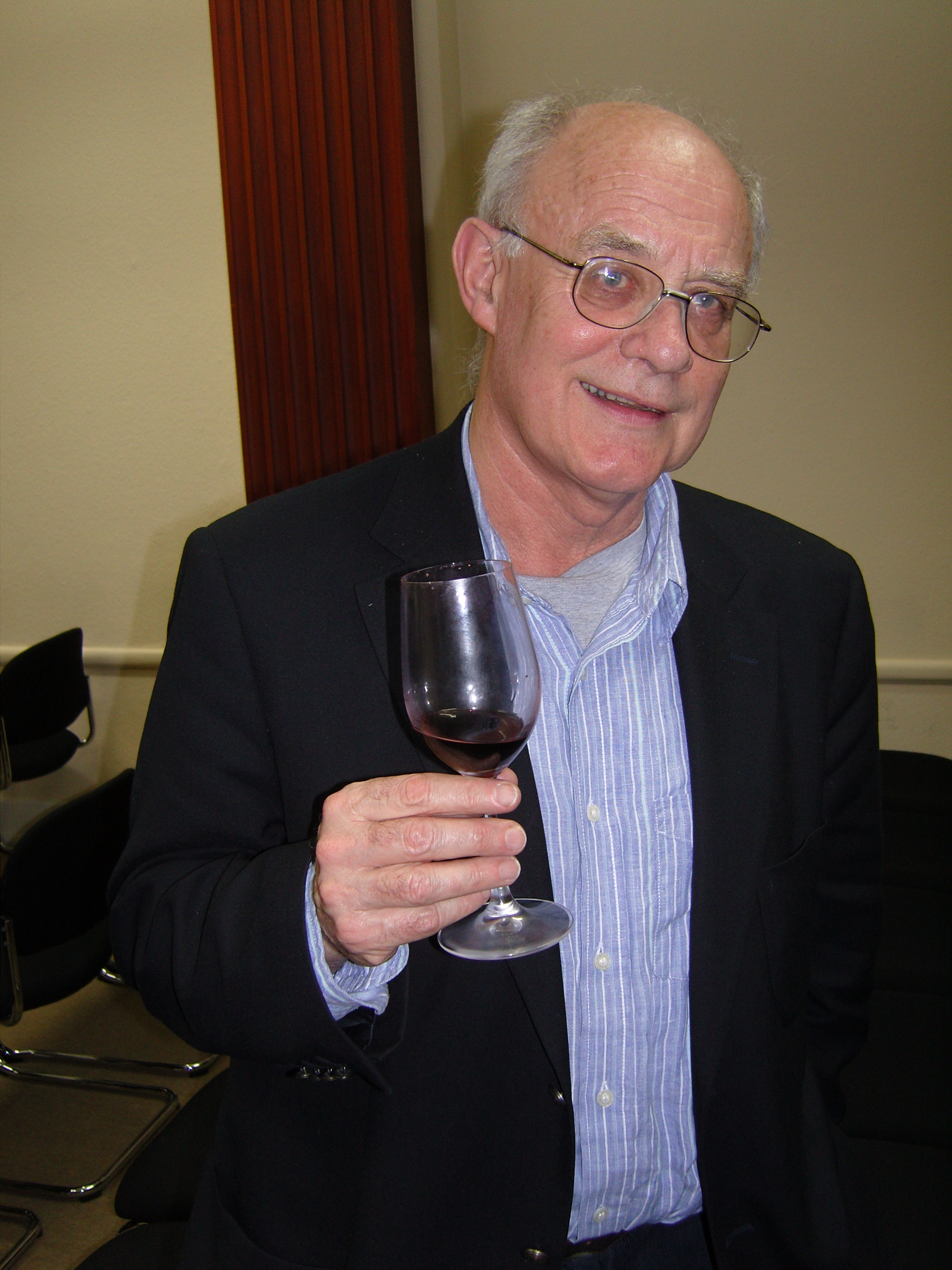
- Angus Macintyre in 2009
- Born: Angus John MacIntyre; 1941 (age 84–85)
- Education: University of Cambridge (BA); Stanford University (PhD)
- Awards: Gödel Lecture (1993); Fellow of the Royal Society (1993); Polya Prize (2003); Fellow of the Royal Society of Edinburgh
- Scientific career
- Workplaces: Queen Mary University of London; University of Edinburgh; University of Oxford; Yale University
- Thesis: Classifying Pairs of Real-Closed Fields (1968)
- Doctoral advisor: Dana Scott
- Doctoral students: Zoé Chatzidakis; Peter Winkler; Ali Nesin; Emily Grosholz; Francisco Miraglia
- Website: maths.qmul.ac.uk/people/amacintyre

Angus John Macintyre FRS, FRSE (born 1941) is a British mathematician and logician who is a leading figure in model theory, logic, and their applications in algebra, algebraic geometry, and number theory. He is Emeritus Professor of Mathematics, at Queen Mary University of London.

== Education ==
After undergraduate study at the University of Cambridge, he completed his PhD at Stanford University under the supervision of Dana Scott in 1968.

== Career and research ==
From 1973 to 1985, he was Professor of Mathematics at Yale University. From 1985 to 1999, he was Professor of Mathematical Logic at Merton College at the University of Oxford. In 1999, Macintyre moved to the University of Edinburgh, where he was Professor of Mathematics until 2002, when he moved to Queen Mary College, University of London. Macintyre was the first Scientific Director of the International Centre for Mathematical Sciences (ICMS) in Edinburgh.

Macintyre is known for many important results. These include classification of aleph-one categorical theories of groups and fields in 1971, which was very influential in the development of geometric stability theory. In 1976, he proved a result on quantifier elimination for p-adic fields from which a theory of semi-algebraic and subanalytic geometry for p-adic fields follows (in analogy with that for the real field) as shown by Jan Denef and Lou van den Dries and others. This quantifier elimination theorem was used by Jan Denef in 1984 to prove a conjecture of Jean-Pierre Serre on rationality of various p-adic Poincaré series, and subsequently these methods have been applied to prove rationality of a wide range of generating functions in group theory (e.g. subgroup growth) and number theory by various authors, notably Dan Segal and Marcus du Sautoy. Macintyre worked with Zoé Chatzidakis and Lou van den Dries on definable sets over finite fields generalising the estimates of Serge Lang and André Weil to definable sets and revisiting the work of James Ax on the logic of finite and pseudofinite fields. He initiated and proved results on the model theory of difference fields and of Frobenius automorphisms, where he proved extensions of Ax's work to this setting (including model-companions and decidability). Independently Ehud Hrushovski has proved model-theoretic results on Frobenius automorphisms. Macintyre developed a first-order model theory for intersection theory and showed connections to Alexander Grothendieck's standard conjectures on algebraic cycles.

Macintyre has proved many results on the model theory of real and complex exponentiation. With Alex Wilkie he proved the decidability of real exponential fields (solving a problem of Alfred Tarski) modulo Schanuel's conjecture from transcendental number theory. With Lou van den Dries he initiated and studied the model theory of logarithmic-exponential series and Hardy fields. Together with David Marker and Lou van den Dries, he proved several results on the model theory of the real field equipped with restricted analytic functions, which has had many applications to exponentiation and O-minimality. The work of van den Dries-Macintyre-Marker has found many applications to (and is a very natural setting for problems in) Diophantine geometry on Shimura varieties (Anand Pillay, Sergei Starchenko, Jonathan Pila) and representation theory (Wilfried Schmid and Kari Vilonen). Macintyre has proved results on Boris Zilber's theory of the complex exponentiation, and Zilber's pseudo-exponential fields.

Macintyre and Jamshid Derakhshan have developed a model theory for the adele ring of a number field where they prove results on quantifier elimination and measurability of definable sets. They use and extend foundational work by Solomon Feferman and Robert Vaught on the first-order theory of products of algebraic structures.

The adele ring was introduced by Claude Chevalley. (The word "adele" is short for "additive idele"^{[2]} and it was invented by André Weil. The previous name was the valuation vectors.) The initial purpose for introducing adeles was simplifying and clarifying class field theory. It quickly found applications in a wide range of problems in number theory after John Tate's thesis, the work of André Weil and Tsuneo Tamagawa on adelic groups and varieties, and work of Robert Langlands and others around the Langlands program.

Jamshid Derakhshan and Angus Macintyre solved in 2023 affirmatively a problem of James Ax posed in his 1968 paper on the elementary theory of finite fields on decidability of the class of all Z/mZ. Their solution uses model theory of adeles.

Macintyre and Marek Karpinski have proved several results on VC-dimension, which has had applications to theoretical computer science and neural networks.

== Awards and honours ==
He was elected a Fellow of the Royal Society in 1993. In 2003, he was awarded the Pólya Prize by the London Mathematical Society. From 2009 to 2011, he was President of the London Mathematical Society (LMS).
