= Tarski Lectures =

Lecture series in mathematical logic

The Alfred Tarski Lectures are an annual distinction in mathematical logic and series of lectures held at the University of California, Berkeley. Established in tribute to Alfred Tarski on the fifth anniversary of his death, the award has been given every year since 1989. Following a 2-year hiatus after the 2020 lecture was not given due to the COVID-19 pandemic, the lectures resumed in 2023.

== Tarski Lecturers ==
The list of past Tarski lecturers is maintained by UC Berkeley.

- 1989 Dana S. Scott
- 1990 Willard Van Orman Quine
- 1991 Bjarni Jónsson, Howard Jerome Keisler
- 1992 Donald A. Martin
- 1993 Alex Wilkie
- 1994 Michael O. Rabin
- 1995 Hilary Putnam
- 1996 Ehud Hrushovski
- 1997 Menachem Magidor
- 1998 Angus Macintyre
- 1999 Patrick Suppes
- 2000 Alexander Razborov
- 2001 Ronald Jensen
- 2002 Boris Zilber
- 2003 Ralph McKenzie
- 2004 Alexander S. Kechris
- 2005 Zlil Sela
- 2006 Solomon Feferman
- 2007 Harvey Friedman
- 2008 Yiannis N. Moschovakis
- 2009 Anand Pillay
- 2010 Greg Hjorth
- 2011 Johan van Benthem
- 2012 Per Martin-Löf
- 2013 Jonathan Pila
- 2014 Stevo Todorčević
- 2015 Julia F. Knight
- 2016 William W. Tait
- 2017 Lou van den Dries
- 2018 Hugh Woodin
- 2019 Thomas Hales
- 2020 Zoé Chatzidakis, not delivered due to the COVID-19 pandemic
- 2023 Richard Shore
- 2024 Ya’acov Peterzil & Sergei Starchenko
- 2025 Jeremy Avigad
- 2026 Grigor Sargsyan

== See also ==
- Center for New Media Lectures
- Howison Lectures
- Gödel Lecture
- List of mathematics awards
- List of philosophy awards
- List of logicians
