= Richard Battye =

British cosmologist

- Born: Richard Antony Battye; 19 October 1969; Huddersfield
- Education: University of Cambridge
- Occupation: Cosmologist
- Scientific career
- Workplaces: University of Manchester; Imperial College London; University of Cambridge (1999–2001)
- Thesis: String radiation, interactions and constraints
- Doctoral advisor: Paul Shellard
- Website: pureprojects.ppad.man.ac.uk/portal/en/researchers/richard-battye(5c9844b3-ab2b-4e64-8b59-32acf12f1c73).html

Richard Battye (born 19 October 1969) is a cosmologist, theoretical physicist and former first-class cricketer. He is currently a Professor of Cosmology at the University of Manchester and has been the associate director (science) in the Jodrell Bank Centre for Astrophysics since 2015.

== Education and career ==
Battye was born on 19 October 1969 in Huddersfield, Yorkshire. His undergraduate was in Mathematics at Trinity College, Cambridge, where he graduated in 1991 with a 1st Class Honours Bachelor of Arts degree, and a Certificate of Advanced Study in Mathematics in 1992. He subsequently studied for a PhD at the Department of Applied Mathematics and Theoretical Physics (DAMTP), supervised by Paul Shellard. He received a Master of Arts degree in 1994, before submitting his thesis on "String radiation, interactions and constraints" in 1995 to become a Doctor of Philosophy in 1996. While at Cambridge, he played eight first-class matches for Cambridge University Cricket Club in 1995, scoring 391 runs at an average of 32.58.

At the end of his PhD he was elected to a research fellowship at Trinity College in 1995, and he also received a PPARC Postdoctoral Fellowship. He was a postdoc at Imperial College for 2 years, followed by 4 years as a postdoc at DAMTP. He received a PPARC advanced research scholarship in 1999. In September 2001 he moved to the School of Physics and Astronomy, University of Manchester as a Lecturer, where he was based at Jodrell Bank Observatory until moving to the Alan Turing Building in 2007. He became a Senior Lecturer in 2005, a Reader in 2008 and a Professor of Cosmology in 2012, before becoming the Associate Director for Science and the head of the Cosmology research group.

== Research ==
His research focuses on the origin of Dark Matter, Dark Energy and Cosmic inflation and their links to particle physics and string theory, via observations of the Cosmic Microwave Background and the large-scale structure of the Universe. He also works on topological defects and solitons. He was a member of the Very Small Array and the Planck collaborations.

== See also ==
- List of Cambridge University Cricket Club players
