= Nicholas J. Higham =

Nicholas J. Higham may refer to:

- Nicholas Higham (Nicholas John Higham), professor of mathematics at the University of Manchester (UK)
- N. J. Higham (Nicholas John 'Nick' Higham), professor emeritus of history at the University of Manchester (UK)
