= Rosa M. Morris =

British applied mathematician

Rosa Margaret Morris
- Rosa Morris in her garden, 1938
- Born: 16 July 1914; Rogerstone, Monmouthshire, Wales, United Kingdom
- Died: 15 October 2011 (aged 97)
- Education: University College of South Wales and Monmouthshire
- Alma mater: University of Cambridge
- Awards: University of Wales Fellowship; Department of Scientific and Industrial Research Senior Research Award
- Scientific career
- Fields: Applied mathematics
- Workplaces: University College of South Wales and Monmouthshire, Cardiff
- Thesis: Two-dimensional potential theory, with special reference to aerodynamic problems (1940)
- Doctoral advisors: George Henry Livens; Geoffrey Ingram Taylor
- Doctoral students: David Edmunds

Rosa Margaret Morris (16 July 1914 – 15 October 2011) was a Welsh applied mathematician, working in potential theory and aerodynamics. When she was 23, her research and examination results made national and international news. She received several fellowships and awards before graduating with a PhD in mathematics from the University of Cambridge in 1940. In her later career, she taught at the University College of South Wales and Monmouthshire (now Cardiff University), where she co-authored a successful textbook on Mathematical Methods of Physics with Roy Chisholm and became one of the first female Heads of School of Mathematics in the United Kingdom.

== Early life and education ==
Morris was born in Rogerstone, Monmouthshire, the youngest child of John and Mary Aline Morris, née Roberts. Her father, who died when she was young, was the headmaster of the elementary school in Rogerstone, and her mother was a schoolmistress. Morris first attended Rogerstone School, then Pontywaun County School, Pontymister, Risca, from 1926 to 1932, with Distinctions in Pure and Applied Mathematics. She studied mathematics at the University College of South Wales and Monmouthshire (now Cardiff University) in Cardiff, graduating with a first class degree in 1936 and continuing as a research student until 1938, working under the supervision of George Henry Livens.

During this time, Morris, aged 23, published her first articles, on potential theory and aerodynamics. Her approach showed "the advantages of using the complex variable in ... boundary problems of mathematical physics" and made national news with human interest stories focusing on her as a "mathematical genius", having "found a method of solving problems in aerodynamics which have hitherto defied all mathematicians". She was described as a "keen hockey player and accomplished dressmaker", and University College of South Wales and Monmouthshire Principal Frederick Rees stated that at her examination, she would have been entitled to 130 percent compared to the next best student, and a special case had to be made for her to avoid handicapping other students. Short reports on her achievements were also printed in American local newspapers.

Morris won scholarships worth £600 for the first year at Girton College, Cambridge, where she was a M. T. Meyer research student. Her fellowships and awards included a University of Wales Fellowship (1938–1940) and a Department of Scientific and Industrial Research Senior Research Award (1939–1941). After three years as a research student, one of them in Cardiff, two in Cambridge, she obtained her PhD from Cambridge University in 1940, with the thesis Two-dimensional potential theory, with special reference to aerodynamic problems. Her Cambridge advisor was Geoffrey Ingram Taylor. Perhaps to save her family money, Morris went to Cambridge by bike.

== Professional career ==
Morris graduated with a PhD in 1940 and became a faculty member in Cardiff in 1941, where she stayed for the rest of her career. She supervised the 1955 PhD thesis of David Edmunds, who later won the Pólya Prize. Together with Roy Chisholm, Morris wrote a textbook titled Mathematical Methods in Physics. It was lacking in rigour, and the reviewer for Mathematics of Computation called the mathematical content "not always adequate, and sometimes ... incorrect", giving as an example an untrue claim about the convergence of Fourier series for a continuous function. Commercially, the book was a success and was reprinted several times. According to Chisholm, "in the late 1960's, North-Holland told us that we had broken their publication record for technical books. We even made a little money." In 1972–1973, while Morris was a Reader in Fluid Dynamics, she served as one of the first female heads of a mathematics department in the UK, possibly the first at a university. Morris retired in 1975.

Morris was a member of the London Mathematical Society (since 1945), of the Mathematical Association, where she was President of the Cardiff Branch 1955–1956, and a Fellow of the Cambridge Philosophical Society until 1983. She was a prolific contributor to Mathematical Reviews, with 188 contributions credited to her name.

== Personal life and legacy ==
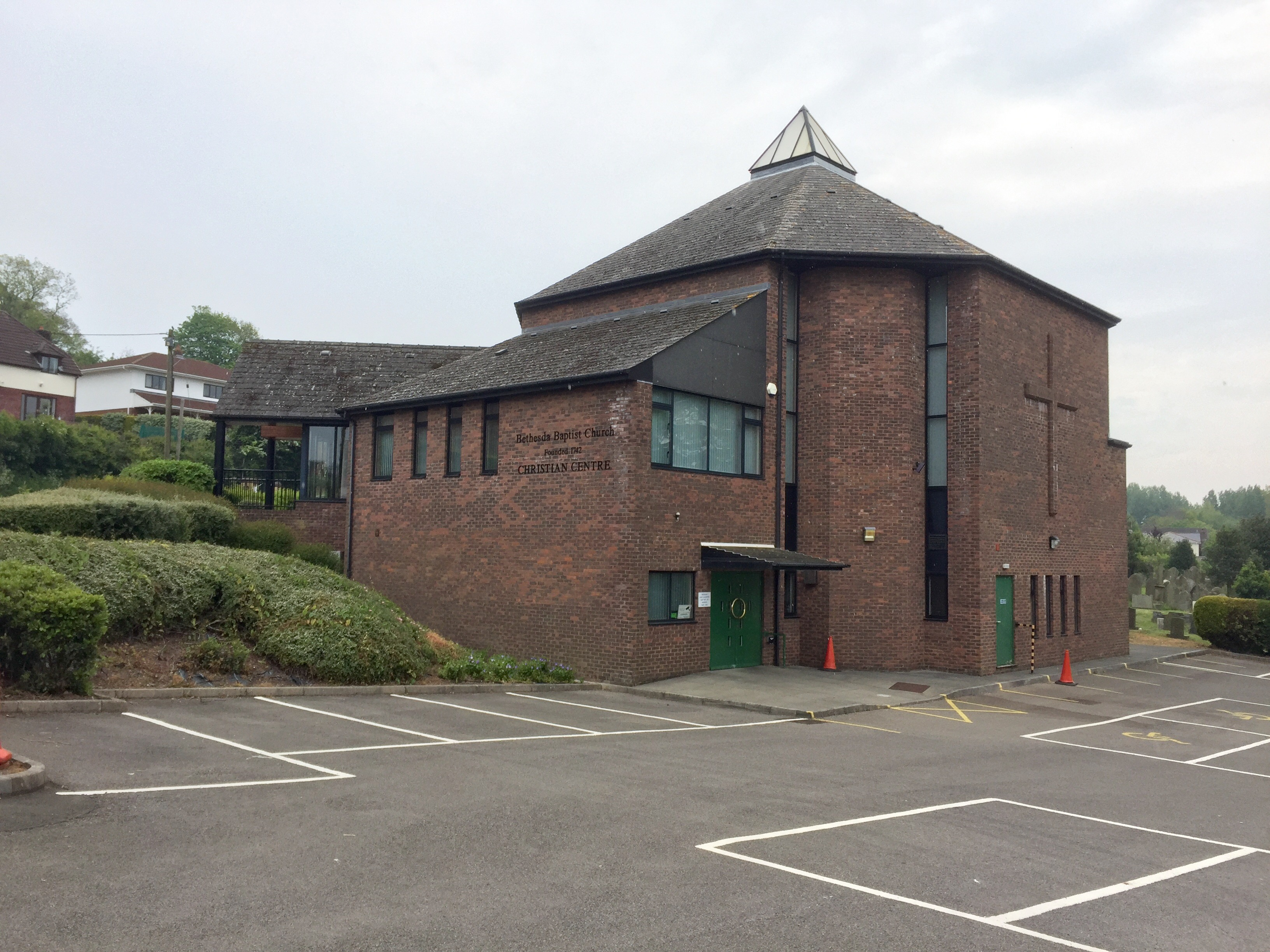
Bethesda Baptist Church, Rogerstone

Morris was a life-long member of the congregation at Bethesda Baptist Church in Rogerstone. When she returned to Wales after completing her PhD studies in Cambridge, she lived in Rogerstone again, where she was a carer for her sister Olwen. After her 2011 death, Morris was buried in the churchyard of Bethesda church, in the same grave as her sister. The headstone describes her as a "renowned mathematician". In local newspapers, her mathematical research is connected to the Supermarine Spitfire fighter aircraft.

Morris is listed in the Davis archive of about 2500 women who achieved honours degrees in Mathematics in Britain before 1940. The PhD was still an uncommon degree for British mathematicians at the time, and Morris is among only seven women who received Mathematics PhD degrees in Britain until 1940, and one of two from Cambridge.

== Publications ==
Morris published research articles on potential theory, fluid dynamics (especially moving aerofoils), and mathematical elasticity theory.

- Morris, Rosa M. (1 February 1937). "XXIV. Notes on two-dimensional potential theory.—I. The force and couple in electrostatic problems". The London, Edinburgh, and Dublin Philosophical Magazine and Journal of Science. 23 (153): 246–251. doi:10.1080/14786443708561795. ISSN 1941-5982.
- Morris, Rosa M. (1 April 1937). "LXXVI. Notes on two-dimensional potential theory.—II. Hydrodynamical problems on the motion of cylinders". The London, Edinburgh, and Dublin Philosophical Magazine and Journal of Science. 23 (156): 757–762. doi:10.1080/14786443708561850. ISSN 1941-5982.
- Morris, Rosa M. (1 June 1937). "CII. Notes on two-dimensional potential theory.—III. The line source influence problems". The London, Edinburgh, and Dublin Philosophical Magazine and Journal of Science. 23 (158): 1082–1096. doi:10.1080/14786443708561878. ISSN 1941-5982.
- Morris, Rosa M. (1 July 1937). "IV. Notes on two-dimensional potential theory.—IV. The expression for the fluid energy and its application". The London, Edinburgh, and Dublin Philosophical Magazine and Journal of Science. 24 (159): 47–52. doi:10.1080/14786443708561888. ISSN 1941-5982.
- Morris, Rosa M. (3 August 1937). "The two-dimensional hydrodynamical theory of moving aerofoils—I". Proceedings of the Royal Society of London. Series A, Mathematical and Physical Sciences. 161 (906): 406–419. Bibcode:1937RSPSA.161..406M. doi:10.1098/rspa.1937.0152.
- Morris, Rosa M. (1 September 1937). "XLIII. Notes on two-dimensional potential theory.— V. The generalized formulæ for the forces and couple on a moving cylinder". The London, Edinburgh, and Dublin Philosophical Magazine and Journal of Science. 24 (161): 445–453. doi:10.1080/14786443708561928. ISSN 1941-5982.
- Morris, Rosa M. (October 1937). "Two-Dimensional Potential Problems". Mathematical Proceedings of the Cambridge Philosophical Society. 33 (4): 474–484. Bibcode:1937PCPS...33..474M. doi:10.1017/S0305004100077616. ISSN 0305-0041. S2CID 120558044.
- Morris, Rosa M. (4 February 1938). "The two-dimensional hydrodynamical theory of moving aerofoils-II". Proceedings of the Royal Society A: Mathematical, Physical and Engineering Sciences. 164 (918): 346–368. Bibcode:1938RSPSA.164..346M. doi:10.1098/rspa.1938.0022.
- Morris, Rosa M. (3 August 1939). "The two-dimensional hydrodynamical theory of moving aerofoils. III". Proceedings of the Royal Society of London. Series A, Mathematical and Physical Sciences. 172 (949): 213–230. Bibcode:1939RSPSA.172..213M. doi:10.1098/rspa.1939.0100.
- Morris, Rosa M. (1 December 1939). "The internal problems of two-dimensional potential theory". Mathematische Annalen. 116 (1): 374–400. doi:10.1007/BF01597363. ISSN 1432-1807. S2CID 121215755.
- Morris, Rosa M. (1 December 1940). "The internal problems of two dimensional potential theory". Mathematische Annalen. 117 (1): 31–38. doi:10.1007/BF01450006. ISSN 1432-1807. S2CID 179178042.
- Morris, Rosa M. (1940). "Some General Solutions of St. Venant's Flexure and Torsion Problem. I". Proceedings of the London Mathematical Society. s2-46 (1): 81–98. doi:10.1112/plms/s2-46.1.81. ISSN 1460-244X.
- Morris, Rosa M. (1946). "Some General Solutions of St. Venant's Torsion and Flexure Problem (II)". Proceedings of the London Mathematical Society. s2-49 (1): 1–18. doi:10.1112/plms/s2-49.1.1. ISSN 1460-244X.
- Morris, Rosa M. (25 February 1947). "The two-dimensional hydrodynamical theory of moving aerofoils. IV". Proceedings of the Royal Society of London. Series A, Mathematical and Physical Sciences. 188 (1015): 439–463. Bibcode:1947RSPSA.188..439M. doi:10.1098/rspa.1947.0019.
- Livens, G. H.; Morris, Rosa M. (1 March 1947). "XIX. The boundary-value problems of plane stress". The London, Edinburgh, and Dublin Philosophical Magazine and Journal of Science. 38 (278): 153–179. doi:10.1080/14786444708561097. ISSN 1941-5982.
- Morris, Rosa M. (1949). "Some General Solutions of St. Venant's Torsion and Flexure Problem (III)". Proceedings of the London Mathematical Society. s2-51 (1): 424–439. doi:10.1112/plms/s2-51.6.424. ISSN 1460-244X.
- Morris, Rosa M. (1 January 1951). "The boundary-value problems of plane stress". The Quarterly Journal of Mechanics and Applied Mathematics. 4 (2): 248–256. doi:10.1093/qjmam/4.2.248. ISSN 0033-5614. Archived from the original on 19 April 2021.
- Morris, Rosa M. (1951). "George Henry Livens". Journal of the London Mathematical Society. s1-26 (2): 156–160. doi:10.1112/jlms/s1-26.2.156. ISSN 1469-7750.
- Morris, Rosa M.; Hawley, F. J. (1 January 1958). "Torsion and flexure of solid cylinders with cross-section transformable to a ring space". The Quarterly Journal of Mechanics and Applied Mathematics. 11 (4): 462–477. doi:10.1093/qjmam/11.4.462. ISSN 0033-5614. Archived from the original on 19 April 2021.
- Chisholm, John Stephen Roy; Morris, Rosa M (1964). Mathematical methods in physics. Amsterdam: North-Holland. OCLC 610944321.
- Morris, Rosa M.; Price, W. G. (September 1972). "Extension of the Curie principle and constitutive relations for fluids with antisymmetric stress". Mathematical Proceedings of the Cambridge Philosophical Society. 72 (2): 243–251. Bibcode:1972PCPS...72..243M. doi:10.1017/S0305004100047071. ISSN 1469-8064. S2CID 123668313.
