= Notre Dame Journal of Formal Logic =

- Discipline: Philosophy
- Language: English
- Edited by: Curtis Franks, Anand Pillay

Publication details
- History: 1960–present
- Publisher: Duke University Press
- Frequency: Quarterly

Standard abbreviations
- ISO 4: Notre Dame J. Form. Log.

Indexing
- ISSN: 0029-4527 (print); 1939-0726 (web)

Links
- Journal homepage

The Notre Dame Journal of Formal Logic is a quarterly peer-reviewed scientific journal covering the foundations of mathematics and related fields of mathematical logic, as well as philosophy of mathematics. It was established in 1960 and is published by Duke University Press on behalf of the University of Notre Dame. The editors-in-chief are Curtis Franks and Anand Pillay (University of Notre Dame).

The founder of the magazine was Boleslaw Sobocinski.

== Abstracting and indexing ==
The journal is abstracted and indexed in:

- Arts and Humanities Citation Index
- Current Contents/Arts and Humanities
- MathSciNet
- Science Citation Index Expanded
- Scopus
- The Philosopher's Index
- Zentralblatt MATH

According to the Journal Citation Reports, the journal has a 2012 impact factor of 0.431.
