= Mathematics Tower, Manchester =

Former University building at the University of Manchester

Coordinates: 53.46701°N 2.23335°W

Mathematics Building
- Maths Tower
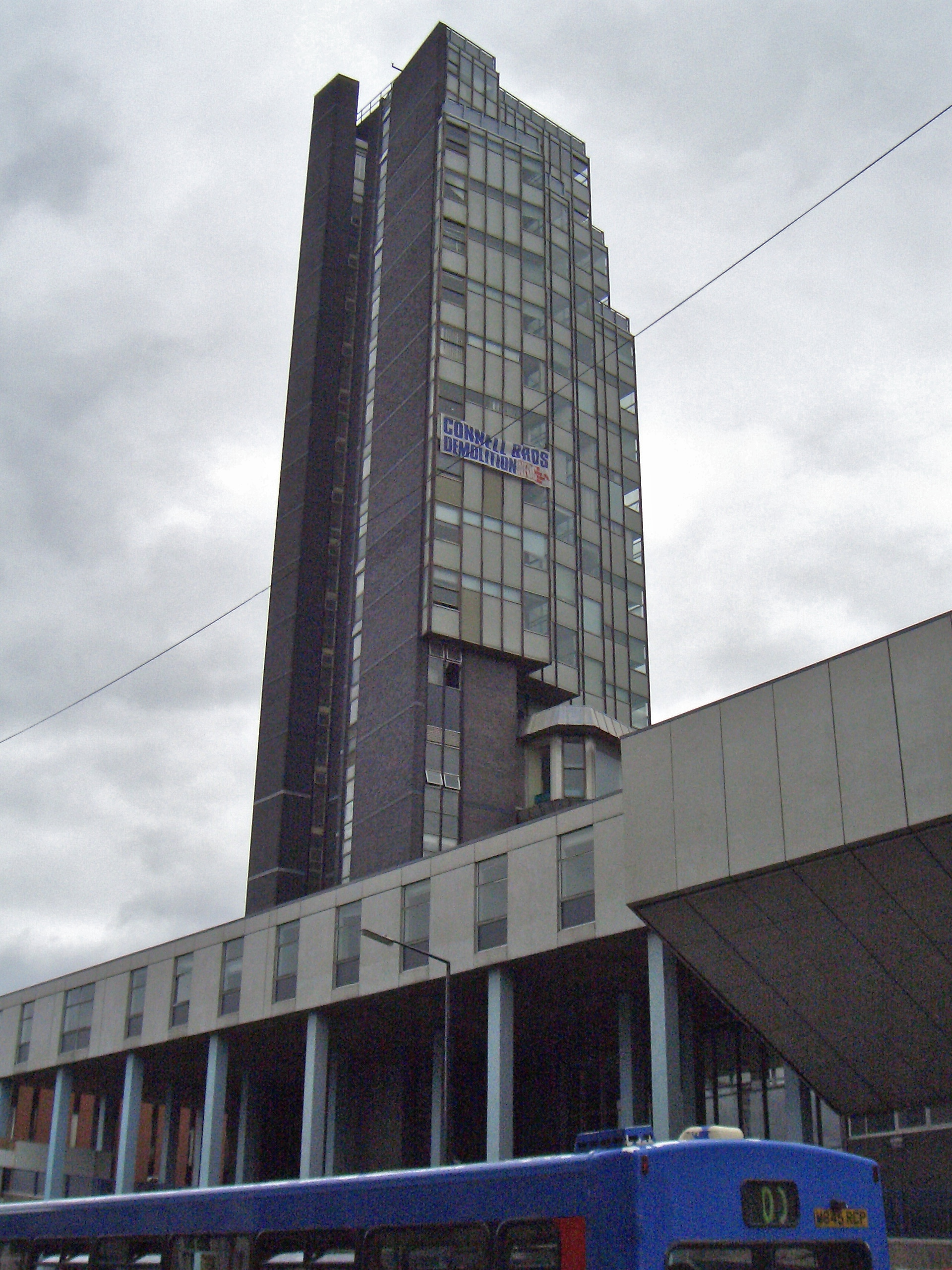
- The Maths Tower in 2005
- Interactive map of the Mathematics Building area

General information
- Status: Demolished
- Type: Academic
- Architectural style: Modernist-brutalism
- Location: Manchester, England
- Completed: 1968
- Demolished: 2005
- Owner: Victoria University of Manchester (1968–2004); University of Manchester (2004–06)

Height
- Height: 75 m (246 ft)

Technical details
- Floor count: 18

Design and construction
- Architect: Scherrer & Hicks

The Mathematics Building in Manchester, England, was a university building which housed the Mathematics Department of the Victoria University of Manchester and briefly the newly amalgamated University of Manchester from 1968 to 2004. The building consisted of a three-storey podium and an 18-storey, 75 m (246 ft) tall tower. It was designed by local architect Scherrer and Hicks with a combination of 1960s-brutalism and international style modernism architecture. It was demolished in 2005 as the maths department moved to the Alan Turing Building on Upper Brook Street.

== Architecture ==
The building was constructed in 1968 and designed by local architect firm, Scherrer and Hicks. The tower had two contrasting façades in juxtaposition; the west-facing side had a concrete brutalist exterior while the east side was clad in windows, which jutted out at varied angles. Both façades represented the current architectural movements of the era; modernism with flush glass panes and brutalism, marked by the use of concrete.

== History ==
In 2004, the University of Manchester was formed with the merger of the Victoria University of Manchester and University of Manchester Institute of Science and Technology. The newly formed university began a programme of renovating its campus buildings and subsequently the Maths Tower was deemed 'unfit for purpose'.

News of the planned demolition saddened some who hoped the tower would be renovated and maintained for the future. Urban Realm magazine spoke in praise of the Maths Tower and describing it as an architecturally bright building in a dreary campus: "what you will mainly see are university buildings totally lacking imagination and style. Of almost all the university buildings of the last forty years, only the Maths Tower has grace and scale. A pity then, that it is unfit for purpose".

The School of Mathematics moved first into temporary buildings (named Lamb and Newmann) and retained use of the Maths and Social Sciences Building while they awaited a move into the Alan Turing Building on Upper Brook Street in 2007. The site of the former tower is now occupied by a £55 million rotunda building called University Place, which houses a number of lecture theatres. 17 New Wakefield Street, completed in 2012, shares some architectural features with the Maths Tower.

== See also ==
- List of Brutalist structures
