= George Henry Livens =

British mathematician

George Henry Livens (1886–1950) was a British mathematician best known for his work on electromagnetics, elasticity and thermodynamics.

He graduated from Cambridge University in 1910 and was awarded the Smith Prize in 1911 for an essay entitled "The influence on density on the position of the emission and absorption lines in a gas spectrum" and was elected fellow of Jesus College. He went on to an appointment as Lecturer in Geometry at Sheffield University, a post he held until 1919 when he was appointed Fielden Lecturer in Manchester. He left this post for a chair at the University College of South Wales in 1922 where he remained for the rest of his career. One of his students was Rosa M. Morris.

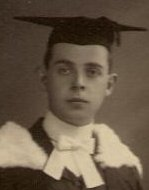
Livens in academic robes in Cambridge 1909

Livens's main work was in electrical theory publishing a book "The Theory of Electricity" in 1918. His work included problems concerned with the motion of charged spheres, the connection between optical properties and electron theory, leading to a new form of the electron theory of the rotatory power in solutions and isotropic media; another topic was the electron theory of metallic conduction.
