= Chatzidakis =

Chatzidakis is a surname. Notable people with the surname include:

- Larry Chatzidakis (born 1949), American politician
- Zoé Chatzidakis (1955–2025), French mathematician
