= Emil Scherrer =

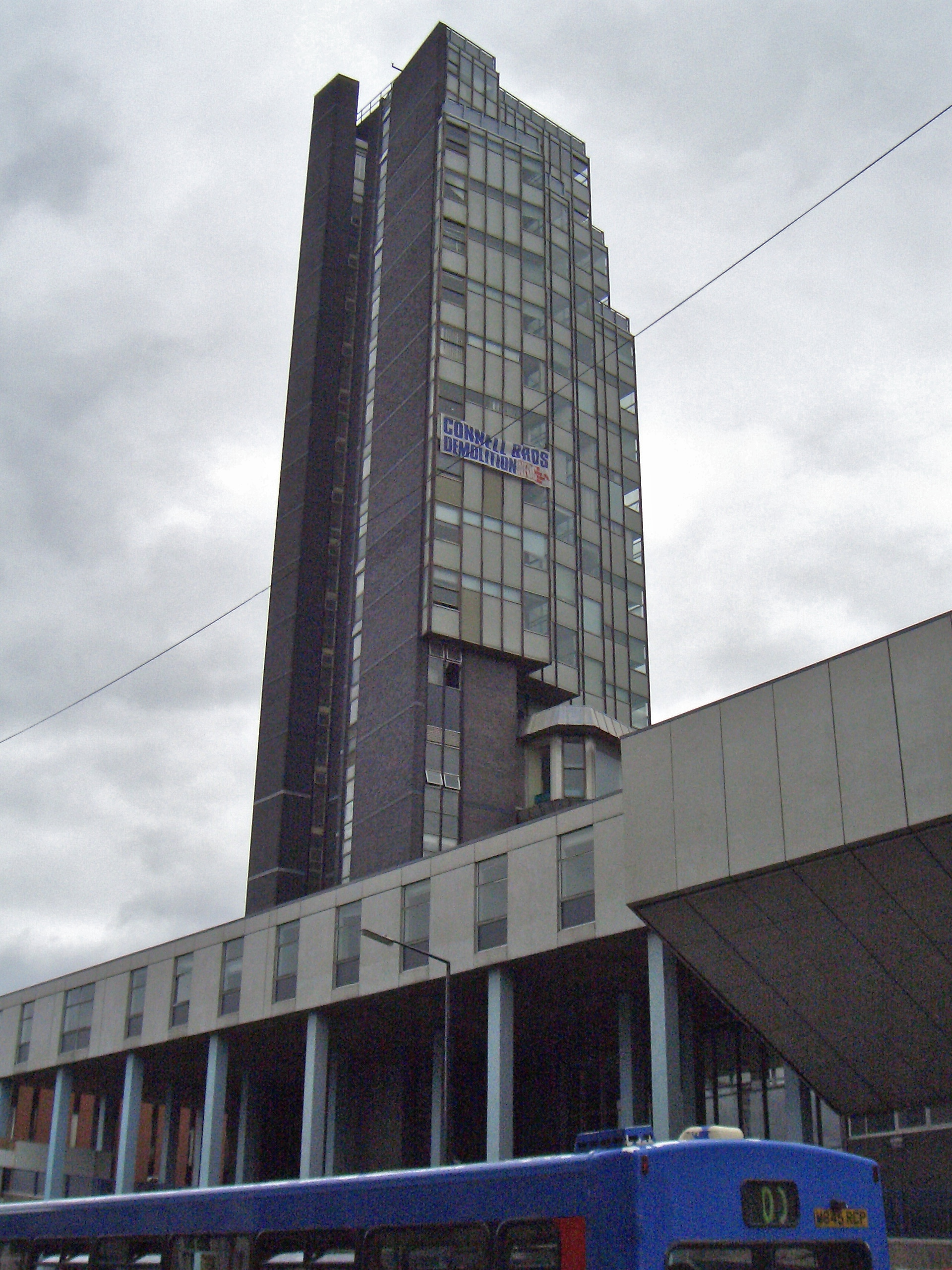
Manchester University Mathematics Tower, 1968

Emil Scherrer (10 April 1911 – 26 May 2006) was an architect who with Kenneth Hicks founded the firm of Scherrer and Hicks shortly after the Second World War when Scherrer was commissioned to design the first petro-chemical plant to be built in the United Kingdom. Other works included schools, laboratories, buildings for the water industry and the Manchester University Mathematics Tower (1968) with Edmund Percey.

His firm was continued by Edmund Percey as Edmund Percey Scherrer and Hicks which still trades.
