= John Stephen Roy Chisholm =

- Born: November 26, 1926; Barnet, Hertfordshire, England
- Died: 10 August 2015 (aged 88)
- Education: University of Cambridge
- Scientific career
- Fields: Mathematical physicist
- Workplaces: University of Kent
- Doctoral advisor: Nicholas Kemmer

J. S. R. (Roy) Chisholm (26 November 1926 – 10 August 2015) was an English mathematical physicist. He was Professor Emeritus of Applied Mathematics at the University of Kent in Canterbury, where he worked from its founding in 1965 until 1994. Before that he held positions at the University of Glasgow (1951-1954) and Cardiff (1954-1962) following which he was appointed Dublin University Professor of Natural Philosophy at Trinity College Dublin (1962-1966). He held BA (1948) and PhD (1952) degrees from Cambridge.

Chisholm developed a method for rational approximations of two variable functions generalising Padé approximant.

Roy Chisholm initiated the first International Conference on Clifford Algebras and Their Applications in Mathematical Physics (ICCA) conference in 1985 which took place at the University of Kent in Canterbury, United Kingdom, and which has happened triennially since then.

He was married to Monty Chisholm, author of a book on English literary figure wife Lucy Clifford and mathematician husband William Kingdon Clifford.

== Books ==
- An Introduction to Statistical Mechanics, with A.H.de Borde, Pergamon Press (1958)
- Mathematical Methods in Physics, with Rosa Morris, North-Holland (1964)
- Vectors in Three-Dimensional Space (Cambridge University Press,1978)
- Clifford Algebras and Their Applications in Mathematical Physics, co-edited with A.K.Common (Reidel 1986)
- Clifford Analysis and its Applications, co-eds F.Brackx & V.Soucek (Kluwer 2001)
- Changing Stations, a Campus Drama (Moat Sole 2014)
