= Eva Hartree =

First woman to be Mayor of Cambridge

- Born: Eva Rayner; 24 December 1873; Stockport, England
- Died: 9 September 1947 (aged 73); Cambridge, England
- Education: Girton College, Cambridge
- Known for: Social activist and politician
- Spouse: William Hartree
- Children: 6, including Douglas Hartree

Eva Hartree (née Rayner; 24 December 1873 – 9 September 1947) was the first woman to be Mayor of Cambridge, in 1924–25.

== Early life ==
Hartree was born Eva Rayner in Stockport in 1873, the daughter of a Jewish doctor, Edwin Rayner and his wife Isabella.

Hartree read natural history at Girton College, Cambridge from 1892, completing tripos in 1895, but not graduating as women did not then proceed to graduation. Also in 1895 she married William Hartree, a lecturer in engineering. She was a suffragist (not a more militant suffragette).

== Civic career ==
Hartree was a Borough Councillor from 1921 to 1927, during which time she was the first woman to be Mayor of Cambridge in 1924–25. As a result of suffering from Graves' disease, she had a short period off the council, but was again a Councillor from 1929 to 1943.

Hartree was elected President of the National Council of Women of Great Britain in 1933 and in her presidential speech in 1936, she called attention to the rise of Nazism in Germany and the treatment of non Aryan people, called for a committee on broadcasting to be set up so that the organsion could have links with the BBC, and raised concerns over women being excluded from roles in the local government.

She served as Secretary of the Cambridge branch of the League of Nations.

After her husband died in 1943, she resigned from the council and moved to London, to work with refugees.

== Personal life ==
The Hartrees had six children, only two of whom survived beyond infancy, and only one of those two to adulthood. The surviving son was Douglas Rayner Hartree, who became Plummer Professor of Mathematical Physics. Her niece through her brother Edwin, (who became a senior figure at the National Physical Laboratory) was geologist Dorothy Helen Rayner. The Hartrees lived at 21 Bentley Road, Trumpington. During the time after William Hartree died and Eva Hartree lived in London, the house was occupied by the scientist John Baker.

Her husband died in 1943, and Hartree herself died in 1947.

== Legacy ==
The Clay Farm community centre in Trumpington has an Eva Hartree Hall. Her photographic portrait in mayoral robes by Olive Edis is held by the National Portrait Gallery.
