= Edmund Percey =

British architect (1929–2014)

- Born: 6 April 1929
- Died: 25 May 2014 (aged 85)
- Occupation: Architect

Edmund Charles "Ted" Percey (6 April 1929 – 25 May 2014) was a British architect with Scherrer and Hicks and later a partner in that firm, who was responsible for the design of several notable concrete constructions for the English water industry as well as the brutalist Mathematics Tower for Manchester University.

== Early life ==
Ted Percey was born in London on 6 April 1929. He had a sister, Eileen. He was educated at Kilburn Grammar School and left school in 1945 to work at Willesden borough council where he met his future wife Betty. He did his national service in the Royal Air Force for two years on turning 18 in 1947, much of which he spent playing the piano in the officer's mess at Gloucester and Stanmore. After his return to Willesden council he married Betty on 22 December 1951 and they had two sons, Alan and Ian.

== Architecture ==
On returning to Willesden council after his national service, Percey was offered a choice of professions and chose to train as an architect while being employed in the council's department of architecture. He studied at the London Polytechnic and qualified as a fellow of the Royal Institute of British Architects. Later, he worked for London County Council.

Percey subsequently joined the firm of Scherrer and Hicks which was formed shortly after the Second World War when Emil Scherrer went into partnership with Kenneth Hicks after Scherrer was commissioned to design the first petrochemical plant to be built in the United Kingdom. Percey mainly worked on schools but the company also had the contract to design buildings for the Lea Valley Water Company and in 1961, Percey designed its headquarters in Chantry Lane, Hatfield, Hertfordshire. The building includes a large Grade II listed concrete mural by William Mitchell, who like Percey once worked for the London County Council.

Other designs by Percey using concrete were the Grade II listed water tower at Tonwell (1964) in Hertfordshire, the brutalist Mathematics Tower at Manchester University (1968) (with Emil Scherrer), the hyperboloid water tower at Cockfosters (1968) in north London, and the water tower at Baydon, Wiltshire (1974).

Percey later became a partner in the firm of Edmund Percey Scherrer and Hicks which still trades.

== Music ==
Percey was a semi-professional jazz pianist all his life and was often seen playing Saturday lunchtime sessions at Richmond Jazz School. He combined music with an interest in amateur dramatics for which he arranged and played the music for Addlestone Community Theatre. He was also a keen amateur painter.

== Death ==
Percey died at home on 25 May 2014, a few days after being released from hospital having suffered a melanoma and bleeding on the brain. He was survived by his wife and sons.

== Works ==
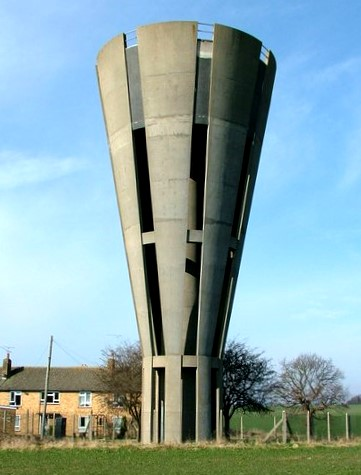
Tonwell Water Tower, Hertfordshire, 1964.

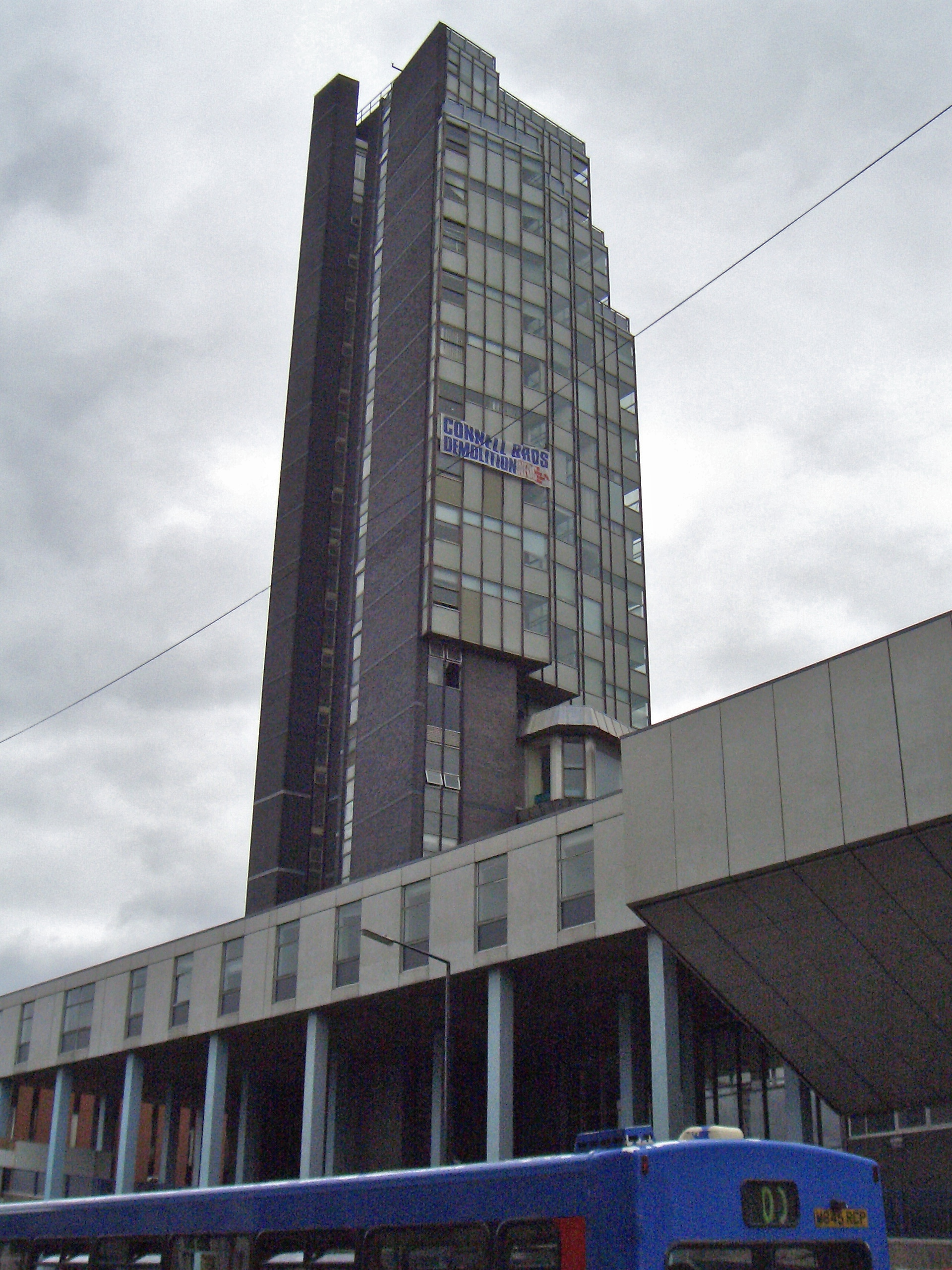
Manchester University Mathematics Tower, 1968.

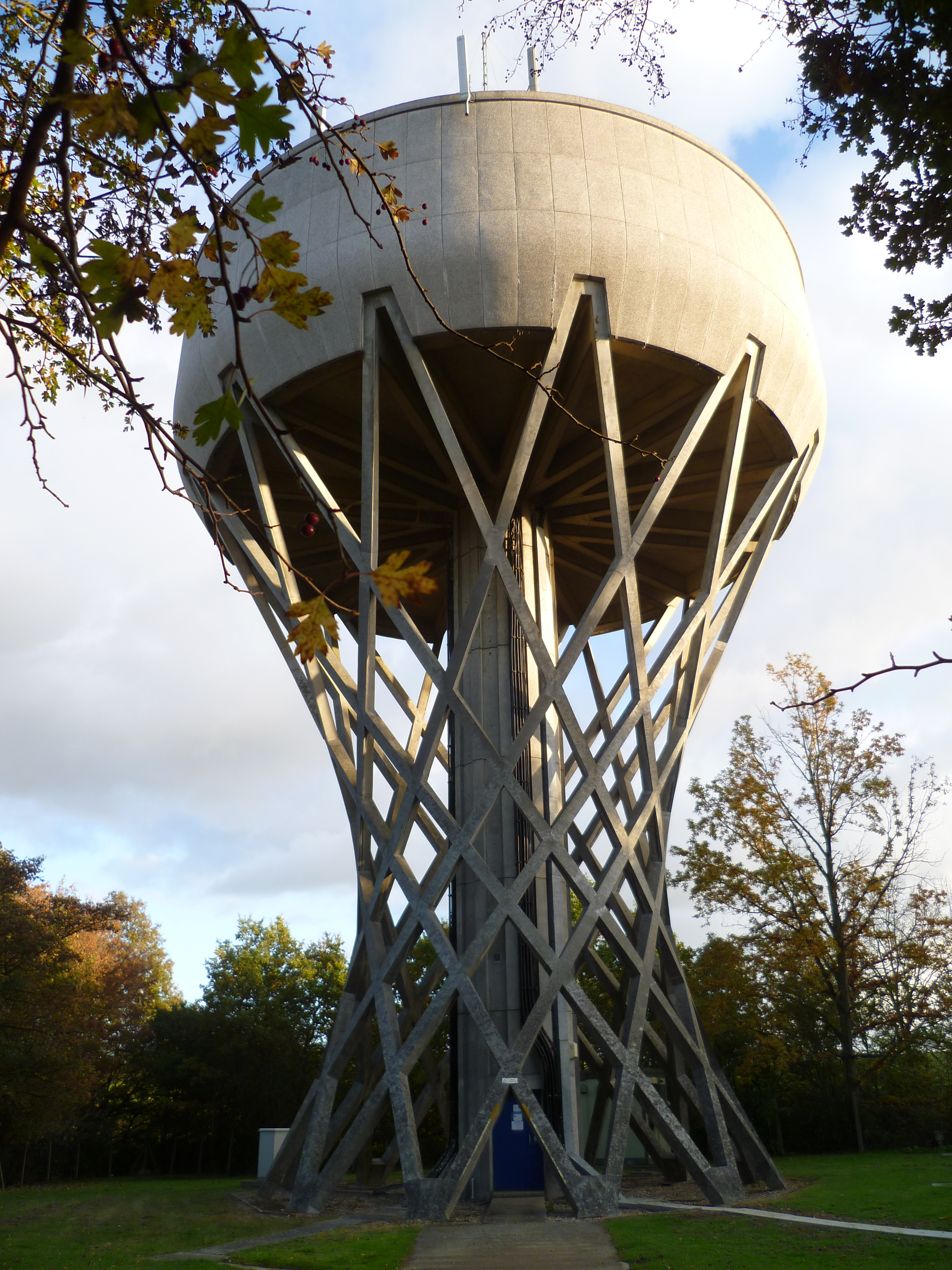
Cockfosters Water Tower, north London (Hertfordshire), 1968.

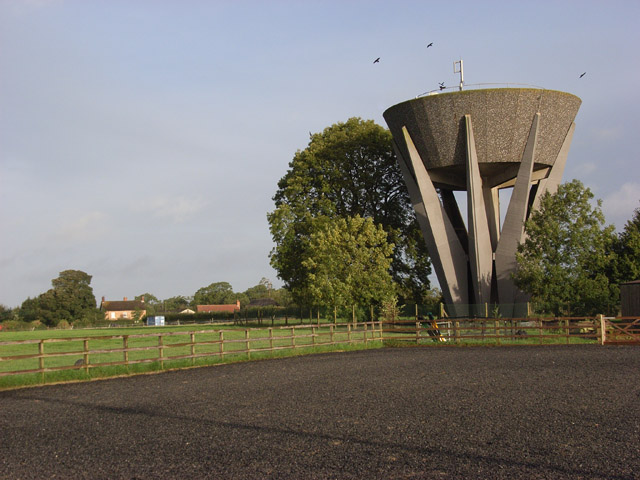
Baydon Water Tower, Wiltshire, 1974.

== Selected publications ==
- "The emancipated water tower", Concrete, 9 (September 1975), p. 22.
