= David Edmunds =

British mathematician

David Eric Edmunds FLSW is a British mathematician working in analysis.

He obtained his PhD in 1955 at the University of Cardiff under the supervision of Rosa M. Morris.

In 1996, he was awarded the Pólya Prize of the London Mathematical Society.

In 2011, he was elected a Fellow of the Learned Society of Wales.

John M. Ball was one of his PhD students.
