= Sergei Starchenko =

Mathematics professor

Sergei Stepanovich Starchenko (Сергей Степанович Старченко) is a mathematical logician who was born and grew up in the Soviet Union and now works in the USA.

Starchenko graduated from the Novosibirsk State University in 1983 with M.S. and then in 1987 received his Ph.D. (Russian Candidate degree) there. His doctoral dissertation Number of models of Horn theories was written under the supervision of Evgenii Andreevich Palyutin. Starchenko was an assistant professor of mathematics at Vanderbilt University and is now a full professor at the University of Notre Dame.

2013 he received the Karp Prize with Ya’acov Peterzil for collaborative work with two other mathematicians. With Peterzil he applied the theory of o-minimal structures to problems in algebra and real and complex analysis.

In 2010 Starchenko was, along with Peterzil, Invited Speaker with the talk Tame complex analysis and o-minimality at the International Congress of Mathematicians in Hyderabad. Starchenko became a Fellow of the American Mathematical Society in the class of 2017. In 2014, he and Kobi Peterzil were invited to give the Tarski Lectures at the University of California, Berkeley.

== Selected publications ==
- with Y. Peterzil: Geometry, Calculus and Zil'ber Conjecture, Bulletin of Symbolic Logic, vol. 2, 1996, pp. 72–83. doi:10.2307/421047
- with Y. Peterzil: A trichotomy theorem for o-minimal structures, Proc. London Math. Soc., vol. 77, 1998, pp. 481–523 doi:10.1112/S0024611598000549
- with Y. Peterzil and A. Pillay: Definably simple groups in o-minimal structures, Transactions American Mathematical Society, vol. 352, 2000, pp. 4397–4419 doi:10.1090/S0002-9947-00-02593-9
- with Y. Peterzil: Uniform definability of the Weierstrass ℘-functions and generalized tori of dimension one, Selecta Math. (N.S.), vol. 10, 2004, pp. 525–550. doi:10.1007/s00029-005-0393-y
- with Y. Peterzil: Definability of restricted theta functions and families of abelian varieties, Duke Math. J., vol. 162, 2013, pp., 731–765. doi:10.1215/00127094-2080018
- with Peterzil: Mild manifolds and a non-standard Riemann existence theorem, Selecta Math. (N.S.), vol. 14, 2009, pp. 275–298. doi:10.1007/s00029-008-0064-x
- On the tomography theorem by P. Schapira: in: Model theory with applications to algebra and analysis. vol. 1, London Math. Soc. Lecture Note Ser., 349, Cambridge Univ. Press, Cambridge, 2008, pp. 283–292 doi:10.1017/CBO9780511735226.014
- with Rahim Moosa: K-analytic versus ccm-analytic sets in nonstandard compact complex manifolds, Fund. Math., vol. 198, 2008, pp. 139–148. doi:10.4064/fm198-2-4]
