= Taylor–Goldstein equation =

Ordinary differential equation used in the field of fluid dynamics

The Taylor–Goldstein equation is an ordinary differential equation used in the fields of geophysical fluid dynamics, and more generally in fluid dynamics, in presence of quasi-2D flows. It describes the dynamics of the Kelvin–Helmholtz instability, subject to buoyancy forces (e.g. gravity), for stably stratified fluids in the dissipation-less limit. Or, more generally, the dynamics of internal waves in the presence of a (continuous) density stratification and shear flow. The Taylor–Goldstein equation is derived from the 2D Euler equations, using the Boussinesq approximation.

The equation is named after G.I. Taylor and S. Goldstein, who derived the equation independently from each other in 1931. The third independent derivation, also in 1931, was made by B. Haurwitz.

== Formulation ==
A schematic diagram of the base state of the system. The flow under investigation represents a small perturbation away from this state. While the base state is parallel, the perturbation velocity has components in both directions.

The equation is derived by solving a linearized version of the Navier–Stokes equation, in the presence of gravity $g$ and a mean density gradient (with gradient-length $L_\rho$), for the perturbation velocity field

$$\mathbf{u} = \left[U(z)+u'(x,z,t), 0 ,w'(x,z,t)\right], \,$$

where $(U(z), 0, 0)$ is the unperturbed or basic flow. The perturbation velocity has the wave-like solution $\mathbf{u}' \propto \exp(i \alpha (x - c t))$ (real part understood). Using this knowledge, and the streamfunction representation $u_x'=d\tilde\phi / dz, u_z'=-i\alpha\tilde\phi$ for the flow, the following dimensional form of the Taylor–Goldstein equation is obtained:

$$(U-c)^2\left({d^2\tilde\phi \over d z^2} - \alpha^2\tilde\phi\right) +\left[N^2-(U-c){d^2 U \over d z^2}\right]\tilde\phi = 0,$$

where $N=\sqrt{g \over L_\rho}$ denotes the Brunt–Väisälä frequency. The eigenvalue parameter of the problem is $c$. If the imaginary part of the wave speed $c$ is positive, then the flow is unstable, and the small perturbation introduced to the system is amplified in time.

Note that a purely imaginary Brunt–Väisälä frequency $N$ results in a flow which is always unstable. This instability is known as the Rayleigh–Taylor instability.

== No-slip boundary conditions ==
The relevant boundary conditions are, in case of the no-slip boundary conditions at the channel top and bottom $z = z_1$ and $z = z_2:$

$$\alpha \tilde\phi = {d \tilde\phi \over d z} = 0 \quad \text{ at }z = z_1\text{ and }z = z_2.$$
