= Beyer Professor of Applied Mathematics =

The Beyer Chair of applied mathematics is an endowed professorial position in the Department of Mathematics, University of Manchester, England. The endowment came from the will of the celebrated locomotive designer and founder of locomotive builder Beyer, Peacock & Company, Charles Frederick Beyer. He was the university's largest single donor.

The first appointment in 1881 was of Arthur Schuster who held the position until 1888. After Schuster's departure, the chair of Mathematics to which Horace Lamb had been appointed in 1885 became the Beyer Professorship of Mathematics and remained so until Lamb's retirement in 1920. At this point an existing chair, of Mathematics and Natural Philosophy to which Sydney Chapman had been appointed in 1919, was renamed the Beyer Professorship of Mathematics and Natural Philosophy. After Chapman's resignation, the Beyer title was applied to the chair of Applied Mathematics. There was no incumbent between 1937 and 1945.

Most of the holders of the post were elected as Fellows of the Royal Society, an honour bestowed on a small minority of UK mathematics professors. Lamb, Champman, Milne and Goldstein all received the Smith's Prize and indication of early career promise. Chapman, Goldstein and Glendinning all received the Adams Prize.

The other endowed chairs in mathematics at the University of Manchester are the Richardson Chair of Applied Mathematics, and the Fielden Chair of Pure Mathematics as well as the named Sir Horace Lamb Chair.

== Beyer Professors ==
- 1881–1888 Arthur Schuster
- 1888–1920 Horace Lamb
- 1920–1924 Sydney Chapman, Beyer Professor of Mathematics and Natural Philosophy
- 1924–1928 Edward Arthur Milne
- 1929–1937 Douglas Hartree
- 1945–1950 Sydney Goldstein
- 1950–1959 James Lighthill
- 1961–1990 Fritz Ursell
- 1991–1996 Philip Hall
- 1996–2017 David Abrahams
- 2017–2024 Vacant
- 2024- Paul Glendinning
