= Dorothy Helen Rayner =

British geologist

- Born: 3 February 1912; Teddington, Middlesex, England
- Died: 31 December 2003 (aged 91); Leeds, West Yorkshire, England
- Education: Bedales School
- Alma mater: Girton College, Cambridge
- Awards: Lyell Medal
- Scientific career
- Fields: Geology, stratigraphy, palaeontology
- Institutions: University of Leeds

Dorothy Helen Rayner (3 February 1912 – 31 December 2003) was a British geologist who became an authority on the stratigraphy of the British Isles while working at University of Leeds. In 1975 she was awarded the prestigious Lyell Medal from the Geological Society of London for her contributions to the field.

== Early life and education ==
Rayner was born in Teddington, Middlesex, the second of three children of Agnes (née Styles) and Edwin Rayner, a senior figure at the National Physical Laboratory. The wider family were steeped in science - cousin Douglas Rayner Hartree was a theoretical physicist, her paternal grandfather Edwin Rayner was a medical doctor and her siblings also read science at Cambridge. Her paternal aunt was Eva Hartree, became the first female Mayor of Cambridge.

Rayner was educated at Bedales School, then read Natural Sciences at Girton College, Cambridge, graduating with a BA (1st Class) in 1935. She was a University Harkness Scholar and received of the G.G.B. Crewdson Memorial prize that year. From 1936 to 1938, she carried out research into vertebrate palaeontology, mainly at Cambridge, but also at University College, London, as a Hertha Ayrton By-Fellow at Girton. She received her doctorate from Cambridge in 1938.

== Career ==
In 1939 she accepted a lecturing post in the Department of Geology at the University of Leeds, which owing to the exigencies of war comprised only three people. From then up until the 1960s she taught stratigraphy and palaeontology. She was promoted to Senior Lecturer in the early 1960s. In 1967, after the publication of The Stratigraphy of the British Isles, she was recognised as a major authority in the field and was widely consulted on matters of stratigraphical procedure. Rayner eventually retired from teaching in 1977, having spent her entire career at Leeds.

Rayner was also closely associated with the Yorkshire Geological Society, serving as principal editor of the Society's Proceedings from 1958 to 1968, and as president from 1969 to 1970. Together with J. E. Hemingway (1906–1997), she co-edited the Society's The Geology and Mineral Resources of Yorkshire in 1974. She was elected an Honorary Member in 1974 and was awarded the Sorby Medal in 1977. Rayner also received the Clough Medal from the Edinburgh Geological Society in 1973, and the Lyell Medal from the Geological Society of London in 1975. She was also a member of the Geologists' Association for 66 years, from 1936 until her death.

Following her retirement Rayner combined her love of botany with her surveying skills to create plant distribution maps of Harlow Carr Gardens, near Harrogate, for the Royal Horticultural Society.

Rayner died on 31 December 2003, following a stroke at her home in Leeds, West Yorkshire.

== Commemoration ==
A new genus of Actinopterygians, Raynerius splendens, was named after Rayner in 2015 "for her contributions to palaeoichthyology, particularly those relating to actinopterygian neurocrania".

== Selected publications ==
- — (1948). "The structure of certain Jurassic holostean fishes with special reference to their neurocrania". Philosophical Transactions of the Royal Society B. 233 (601). London: Royal Society: 287–345. Bibcode:1948RSPTB.233..287R. doi:10.1098/rstb.1948.0006.
- — (1953). "The Lower Carboniferous Rocks in the North of England: a review". Proceedings of the Yorkshire Geological Society. 28 (4). Wakefield: Yorkshire Geological Society: 231–315. Bibcode:1953PYGS...28..231R. doi:10.1144/pygs.28.4.231.
- — (1963). "The Achanarras limestone of the Middle Old Red Sandstone, Caithness, Scotland". Proceedings of the Yorkshire Geological Society. 34 (2). Wakefield: Yorkshire Geological Society: 117–138. Bibcode:1963PYGS...34..117R. doi:10.1144/pygs.34.2.117.
- — (1967). The Stratigraphy of the British Isles. London: Cambridge University Press. Second edition with major revisions year=1987
- — & Hemingway, John Edwin, eds. (1974). The Geology and Mineral Resources of Yorkshire. Leeds, England: Yorkshire Geological Society.
- — (1982). English language and usage in geology: a personal compilation. Leeds, England: Yorkshire Geological Society.
