= Fielden Professor of Pure Mathematics =

The Fielden Chair of Pure Mathematics is an endowed professorial position in the School of Mathematics, University of Manchester, England.

== History ==
In 1870 Samuel Fielden, a wealthy mill owner from Todmorden, donated £150 to Owens College (as the Victoria University of Manchester was then called) for the teaching of evening classes and a further £3000 for the development of natural sciences at the college. From 1877 this supported the Fielden Lecturer, subsequently to become the Fielden Reader with the appointment of L. J. Mordell in 1922 and then Fielden Professor in 1923. Alex Wilkie FRS was appointed to the post in 2007.

== Holders ==
Previous holders of the Fielden Chair (and lectureship) are:

- A. T. Bentley (1876–1880) Lecturer in Pure Mathematics
- J. E. A. Steggall (1880–1883) Lecturer in Pure Mathematics
- R. F. Gwyther (1883–1907) Lecturer in Mathematics
- F. T. Swanwick (1907–1912) Lecturer in Mathematics
- H. R. Hasse (1912–1918) Lecturer in Mathematics
- George Henry Livens (1920–1922) Lecturer in Mathematics
- Louis Mordell (1923–1945)
- Max Newman (1945–1964)
- Frank Adams (1964–1971)
- Ian G. Macdonald (1972–1976)
- Norman Blackburn (1978–1994)
- Mark Pollicott (1996–2004)
- Alex Wilkie (2007–)
- Radha Kessar (2024–)

== Related chairs ==
The other endowed chairs in mathematics at the University of Manchester are the Beyer Chair of Applied Mathematics, the Sir Horace Lamb Chair and the Richardson Chair of Applied Mathematics.
