= Douglas Hartree =

British mathematician and physicist (1897–1958)

Douglas Hartree FRS
- Born: Douglas Rayner Hartree; 27 March 1897; Cambridge, England
- Died: 12 February 1958 (aged 60); Cambridge, England
- Education: St John's College, Cambridge
- Known for: MCHF; Appleton–Hartree equation; Differential analyser; Hartree (unit of energy); Hartree equation; Hartree–Fock method
- Awards: Fellow of the Royal Society
- Scientific career
- Fields: Numerical analysis Atomic physics
- Workplaces: University of Manchester; Ministry of Supply; University of Cambridge
- Doctoral advisor: Ralph H. Fowler
- Doctoral students: Oscar Buneman; Charlotte Fischer; Aaron Klug; Phyllis Nicolson; Cicely Ridley

Douglas Rayner Hartree FRS (27 March 1897 – 12 February 1958) was an English mathematician and physicist most famous for the development of numerical analysis and its application to the Hartree–Fock equations of atomic physics and the construction of a differential analyser using Meccano.

== Early life and education ==
Douglas Hartree was born in Cambridge, England. His father, William, was a lecturer in engineering at the University of Cambridge. His mother, Eva Rayner, was president of the National Council of Women of Great Britain and first woman to be mayor of the city of Cambridge. One of his great-grandfathers was Samuel Smiles; another was the marine engineer William Hartree, partner of John Penn. Douglas Hartree was the oldest of three sons who survived infancy. A brother and sister died in infancy when he was still a child, but his two brothers would later also die. Hartree's 7-year-old brother John Edwin died when Hartree was 17, and Hartree's 22-year-old brother Colin William died from meningitis in February 1920 when Hartree was 23. His maternal cousin was the geologist Dorothy Helen Rayner.

Hartree attended St Faith's School in Cambridge, then Bedales School, returning to Cambridge for his degree studies at St John's College, Cambridge, which the first World War interrupted. He (and his father and brother) joined a group working on anti-aircraft ballistics under A. V. Hill, where he gained considerable skill and an abiding interest in practical calculation and numerical methods for differential equations, executing most of his own work with pencil and paper. According to Hill, writing in Hartree's obituary, ‘Quietly one day he improvised a long-base height-finder out of some wires, posts, and a steel tape’. This became known as the Hartree height-finder and was used extensively by British Anti-Aircraft troops until better optical height-finders were introduced. Its advantage was said to be that the height can be calculated from the observed quantities ‘very rapidly by the use of nothing but simple arithmetic’. It was also cheap to manufacture and easy to use.

After the end of World War I, Hartree returned to Cambridge graduating in 1922 with a Second Class degree in natural sciences.

== Atomic structure calculations ==
In 1921, a visit by Niels Bohr to Cambridge inspired Hartree to apply his numerical skills to Bohr's theory of the atom, for which he obtained his PhD in 1926 – his advisor was Ernest Rutherford. With the publication of Schrödinger's equation in the same year, Hartree was able to apply his knowledge of differential equations and numerical analysis to the new quantum theory. He derived the Hartree equations for the distribution of electrons in an atom and proposed the self-consistent field method for their solution. The wavefunctions from this theory did not satisfy the Pauli exclusion principle for which Slater showed that determinantal functions are required. V. Fock published the "equations with exchange" now known as Hartree–Fock equations. These are considerably more demanding computationally even with the efficient methods Hartree proposed for the calculation of exchange contributions. Today, the Hartree-Fock equations are of great importance to the field of computational chemistry, and are applied and solved numerically within most of the density functional theory programs used for electronic structure calculations of molecules and condensed phase systems.

== Manchester years ==
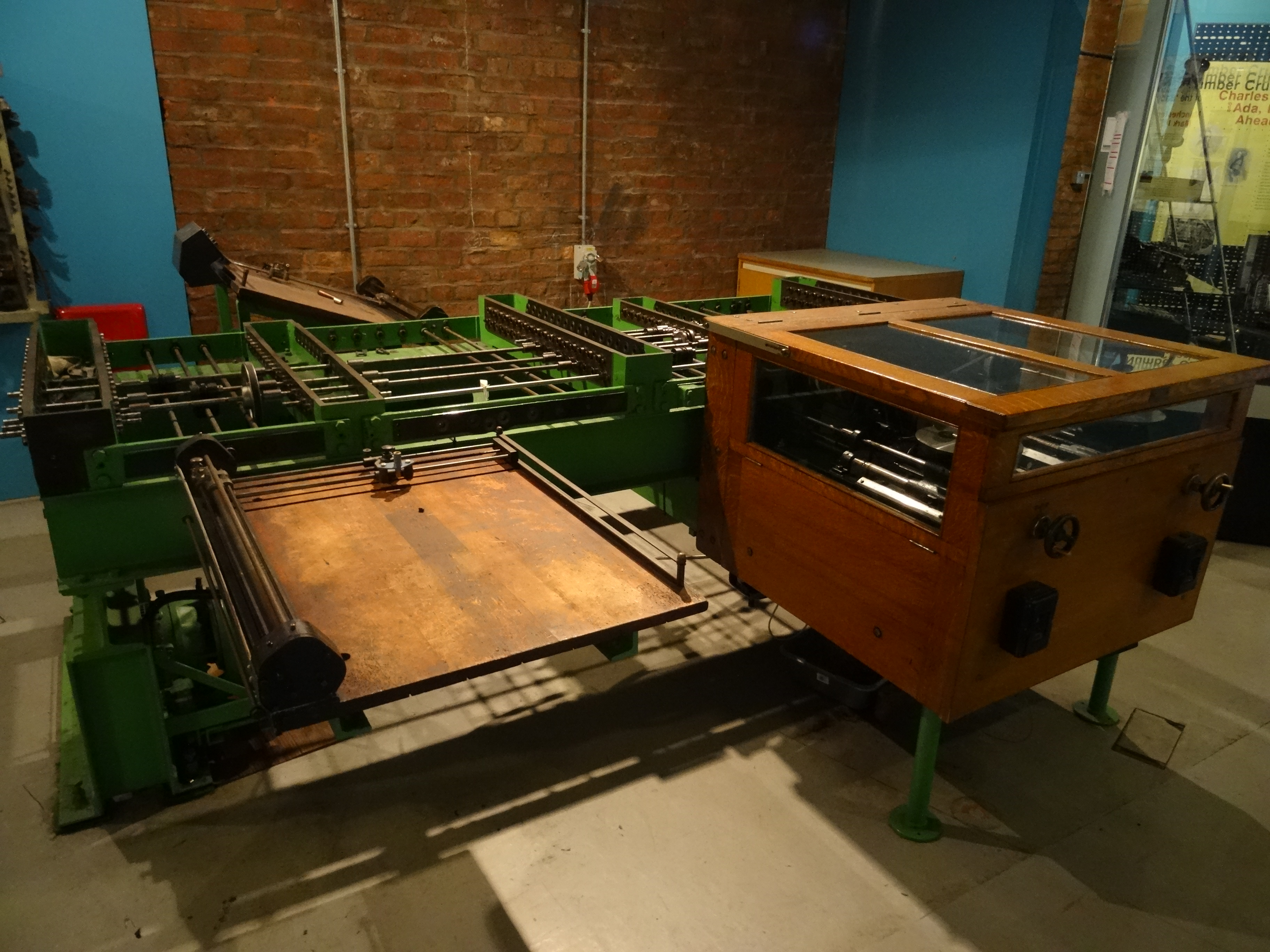
Differential analyser designed by Douglas Hartree, at Museum of Science and Industry in Manchester.

In 1929, Hartree was appointed to the Beyer Chair of Applied Mathematics at the University of Manchester. and was elected to membership of the Manchester Literary and Philosophical Society in 1929.

In 1933, he visited Vannevar Bush at the Massachusetts Institute of Technology and learned first hand about his differential analyser. Immediately on his return to Manchester, he set about building his own analyser from Meccano. Seeing the potential for further exploiting his numerical methods using the machine, he persuaded Sir Robert McDougall to fund a more robust machine, which was built in collaboration with Metropolitan-Vickers.

The first application of the machine, reflecting Hartree's enthusiasm for railways, was calculating timetables for the London, Midland and Scottish Railway. He spent the rest of the decade applying the differential analyser to find solutions of differential equations arising in physics, including control theory and laminar boundary layer theory in fluid dynamics, making significant contributions to each of the fields.

The differential analyser was not suitable for the solution of equations with exchange. When Fock's publication pre-empted Hartree's work on equations with exchange, Hartree turned his research to radio-wave propagation that led to the Appleton–Hartree equation. In 1935, his father, William Hartree, offered to do calculations for him. Results with exchange soon followed. Douglas recognised the importance of configuration interaction that he referred to as "superposition of configurations". The first multiconfiguration Hartree–Fock results were published by father, son, and Bertha Swirles (later Lady Jeffreys) in 1939.

At Hartree's suggestion, Bertha Swirles proceeded to derive equations with exchange for atoms using the Dirac equation in 1935. With Hartree's advice, the first relativistic calculations (without exchange) were reported in 1940 by A. O. Williams, a student of R. B. Lindsay.

== Second World War ==
During the Second World War Hartree supervised two computing groups. The first group, for the Ministry of Supply, has been described by Jack Howlett as a "job shop" for the solution of differential equations. At the outbreak of World War II, the differential analyser at the University of Manchester was the only full-size (eight integrator) differential analyser in the country. Arrangements were made to have the machine available for work in support of the national war effort. In time, the group consisted of four members (Jack Howlett, Nicholas R. Eyres, J. G. L. Michel, Douglas Hartree, and Phyllis Lockett Nicolson). Problems were submitted to the group without information about the source but included the automatic tracking of targets, radio propagation, underwater explosions, heat flow in steel, and the diffusion equation later found to be for isotope separation. The second group was the magnetron research group of Phyllis Lockett Nicolson, David Copely, and Oscar Buneman. The work was done for the Committee for the Co-ordination of the Valve Development assisting the development of radar. A differential analyser could have been used if more integrators had been available, so Hartree set up his group as three "CPUs" to work on mechanical desk calculators in parallel. For a method of solution, he selected what is now a classical particle simulation. Hartree never published any of his magnetron research findings in journals though he wrote numerous highly technical secret reports during the war.

In April 1944 a committee which included Hartree recommended that a mathematical section be set up within the National Physical Laboratory (NPL). In October this recommendation was put into effect with its first two objectives being the investigation of the possible adaptation of automatic telephone equipment to scientific equipment and the development of electronic computing devices suitable for rapid computing. One suspects that some members already knew of the Colossus computer. John R. Womersley (Turing's bête noire) was the first Director. In February 1945 he went on a two-month tour of computing installations in the US, including visiting ENIAC (still not complete). He became acquainted with drafts of von Neumann's famous June 1945 EDVAC report. About two months later Hartree also went over to see ENIAC, not then publicly known.

== Later life and work ==
In February 1946, Max Newman (who had been involved in the Colossus computer) submitted an application to the Royal Society for funds to start the task of building a general-purpose computer at the University of Manchester. The Royal Society referred the request to Hartree and C.G. Darwin, Director of the NPL, to advise them. Hartree recommended the grant but Darwin opposed it on the grounds that Turing's ACE at NPL would be sufficient to serve the needs of the country. But Hartree's view won the day and the Manchester developments in computing were started.

Hartree did further work in control systems and was involved in the early application of digital computers, advising the US military on the use of ENIAC for calculating ballistics tables. In the summer of 1946 Hartree made his second trip to ENIAC as an evaluation of its applicability to a broad range of science, when he became the first civilian to program it. For this he selected a problem involving the flow of a compressible fluid over a surface, such as air over the surface of a wing travelling faster than the speed of sound.

At the end of 1945 or very early in 1946 Hartree briefed Maurice Wilkes of the University of Cambridge on the comparative developments in computing in the USA which he had seen. Wilkes, then received an invitation from the Moore School of Electrical Engineering (the builders of ENIAC) to attend a course on electronic computers. Before leaving for this, Hartree was able to brief him more fully on ENIAC. It was on the boat home that Wilkes planned the original design of EDSAC, which was to become operational in May 1949. Hartree worked closely with Wilkes in developing use of the machine for a wide range of problems and, most importantly, showed users from a number of areas in the university how they could use it in their research work.

Hartree returned to Cambridge to take up the post of Plummer professor of mathematical physics in 1946. In October he gave an inaugural lecture entitled "Calculating Machines: Recent and Prospective Developments and their impact on Mathematical Physics". This described ENIAC and the work that Hartree had done on it. Even in 1946, two years before stored programming electronic computing became a reality, Hartree saw the need for the use of sub-routines. His inaugural lecture ended with a look at what computers might do. He said: "..there are, I understand many problems of economic, medical and sociological interest and importance awaiting study which at present cannot be undertaken because of the formidable load of computing involved."

On 7 November 1946 The Daily Telegraph, having interviewed Hartree, quoted him as saying: "The implications of the machine are so vast that we cannot conceive how they will affect our civilisation. Here you have something which is making one field of human activity 1,000 times faster. In the field of transportation, the equivalent to ACE would be the ability to travel from London to Cambridge ... in five seconds as a regular thing. It is almost unimaginable."

Hartree's fourth and final major contribution to British computing started in early 1947 when the catering firm of J. Lyons & Co. in London heard of the ENIAC and sent a small team in the summer of that year to study what was happening in the US, because they felt that these new computers might be of assistance in the huge amount of administrative and accounting work which the firm had to do. The team met with Col. Herman Goldstine at the Institute for Advanced Study in Princeton who wrote to Hartree telling him of their search. As soon as he received this letter, Hartree wrote and invited representatives of Lyons to come to Cambridge for a meeting with him and Wilkes. This led to the development of a commercial version of EDSAC developed by Lyons, called LEO, the first computer used for commercial business applications. After Hartree's death, the headquarters of LEO Computers was renamed Hartree House. This illustrates the extent to which Lyons felt that Hartree had contributed to their new venture.

Hartree's last famous contribution to computing was an estimate in 1950 of the potential demand for computers, which was much lower than turned out to be the case: "We have a computer here in Cambridge, one in Manchester and one at the [NPL]. I suppose there ought to be one in Scotland, but that's about all." Such underestimates of the number of computers that would be required were common at the time.

Hartree's last PhD student at Cambridge, Charlotte Froese Fischer, became known for the development and implementation of the multi-configuration Hartree–Fock (MCHF) approach to atomic structure calculations and for her theoretical prediction concerning the existence of the negative calcium ion.

== Personal life ==
Outside of his professional life, Douglas Hartree was passionate about music, having an extensive knowledge of orchestral and chamber music. He played piano and was conductor of an amateur orchestra. This passion for music was perhaps what brought him together with his wife, Elaine Charlton, who was an accomplished pianist. Their marriage resulted in two sons, Oliver and John Richard, and one daughter, Margaret. He died of heart failure in Addenbrooke's Hospital, Cambridge, on 12 February 1958.

== Honours and awards ==
- Fellow of the Royal Society (1932)
- The Hartree unit of energy is named after him.
- The Hartree Centre is named after him.

== Books ==
- Hartree, D. R. (1949). Calculating Instruments and Machines. Urbana: University of Illinois Press. (also (1950) Cambridge University Press)
- Hartree, D. R. (1952). Numerical Analysis. Oxford University Press.
- Hartree, D. R. (1957). The calculation of Atomic Structures. New York: Wiley & Sons.
- Hartree, D. R. (1984). Calculating Machines: Recent and prospective developments and their impact on Mathematical Physics and Calculating Instruments and Machines. The Charles Babbage Institute reprint series for the History of Computing. Vol. 6. Cambridge, USA: MIT Press.

Preceded by Edward Arthur Milne	Beyer Chair of Applied Mathematics at University of Manchester; 1929–1937	Succeeded by Sydney Goldstein
Professional and academic associations
Preceded by Robert Henry Clayton	President of the Manchester Literary and Philosophical Society; 1939–40	Succeeded by Herbert John Fleure
