= Richardson Professor of Applied Mathematics =

Position at the University of Manchester in England

The Richardson Chair of Applied Mathematics is an endowed professorial position in the School of Mathematics, University of Manchester, England. The chair was founded by an endowment of £3,600 from one John Richardson, in 1890. The endowment was originally used to support the Richardson Lectureship in Mathematics. One holder of the Richardson Lectureship was John Edensor Littlewood (1907–1910). The position lapsed in 1918, but was resurrected as a lectureship in Pure Mathematics between 1935 and 1944. There was then a further hiatus until the establishment of the Richardson Chair of Applied Mathematics in 1998. The current holder (since 1998) is Nicholas Higham.

A complete list of Richardson Lecturers and Professors is as follows:

- F. T. Swanwick (1891–1907) Lecturer in Mathematics
- J. E. Littlewood (1907–1910) Lecturer in Mathematics
- H. R. Hasse (1910–1912) Lecturer in Mathematics
- W. D. Evans (1912–1918) Lecturer in Mathematics
- W. N. Bailey (1935–1944) Lecturer in Pure Mathematics
- N. J. Higham (1998– ) Professor of Applied Mathematics

The School of Mathematics has three other endowed chairs, the others being the Beyer Chair, the Fielden Chair of Pure Mathematics and the Sir Horace Lamb Chair.
