= Vectors in Three-dimensional Space =

Book by John Stephen Roy Chisholm

- Author: J. S. R. Chisholm
- Genre: Non-fiction
- Publisher: Cambridge University Press
- Publication date: 1978

Vectors in Three-dimensional Space (1978) is a book concerned with physical quantities defined in "ordinary" 3-space. It was written by J. S. R. Chisholm, an English mathematical physicist, and published by Cambridge University Press. According to the author, such physical quantities are studied in Newtonian mechanics, fluid mechanics, theories of elasticity and plasticity, non-relativistic quantum mechanics, and many parts of solid state physics. The author further states that "the vector concept developed in two different ways: in a wide variety of physical applications, vector notation and techniques became, by the middle of this century, almost universal; on the other hand, pure mathematicians reduced vector algebra to an axiomatic system, and introduced wide generalisations of the concept of a three-dimensional 'vector space'." Chisholm explains that since these two developments proceeded largely independently, there is a need to show how one can be applied to the other.

== Summary ==
Vectors in Three-Dimensional Space has six chapters, each divided into five or more subsections. The first on linear spaces and displacements including these sections: Introduction, Scalar multiplication of vectors, Addition and subtraction of vectors, Displacements in Euclidean space, Geometrical applications. The second on Scalar products and components including these sections: Scalar products, Linear dependence and dimension, Components of a vector, Geometrical applications, Coordinate systems. The third on Other products of vectors. The last three chapters round out Chisholm's integration of these two largely independent developments.
