= Sydney Goldstein =

British mathematician (1903–1989)

- Born: 3 December 1903; Kingston upon Hull, United Kingdom
- Died: 22 January 1989 (aged 85)
- Education: University of Leeds; Cambridge University
- Known for: Taylor-Goldstein equation
- Scientific career
- Fields: Fluid dynamics
- Workplaces: University of Göttingen; University of Manchester; Cambridge University
- Thesis: The Theory And Application Of Mathieu Functions (1928)
- Doctoral advisor: Harold Jeffreys
- Doctoral students: Leslie Howarth

Sydney Goldstein FRS (3 December 1903 – 22 January 1989) was a British mathematician noted for his contribution to fluid dynamics. He is described as: "... one of those who most influenced progress in fluid dynamics during the 20th century."

He was especially known for his work on steady-flow laminar boundary-layer equations and on the turbulent resistance to rotation of a disk in a fluid. Goldstein was extremely knowledgeable on aerodynamics and his work had a significant impact in that area.

== Early life ==
Goldstein was born into the Jewish community of Hull, where his family ran a furniture store. After his mother died he moved to live with an aunt and attended Bede Collegiate School in Sunderland. At the University of Leeds in 1921 he studied mathematics, but was to move to St John's College, Cambridge, graduating from the Mathematical Tripos in 1925 and gaining the Smith's Prize in 1927. He was awarded an Isaac Newton Studentship to continue research in applied mathematics under Harold Jeffreys. His 1928 PhD thesis was entitled The Theory And Application Of Mathieu Functions.

== Career ==
He was appointed Rockefeller Research Fellow and spent a year working in University of Göttingen. In 1929 he became a fellow of St John's College but later the same year was appointed to a lectureship in Mathematics at the University of Manchester. At Manchester the influence of Osborne Reynolds and Horace Lamb in fluid dynamics was still felt there and had a strong effect on Goldstein. Moving to Cambridge in 1931 he took over the editorship of Modern Developments in Fluid Dynamics on Lamb's death.

During World War II Goldstein worked on boundary layer theory at the National Physical Laboratory and at the end of the war he was appointed to the Beyer Chair of Applied Mathematics in Manchester. He was elected to the membership of Manchester Literary and Philosophical Society in 1947.

Goldstein strongly supported the State of Israel and in 1950 he accepted the chairmanship of the department of mathematics at Technion – Israel Institute of Technology. Having made a major contribution to the establishment of the Technion, he found the administrative load too heavy and moved again, accepting the chair of Gordon McKay Professor of Applied Mathematics at Harvard University in 1954. He retired in 1968 but continued as an emeritus professor at Harvard.

== Honours ==
- Mayhew Prize, 1925
- Smith's Prize, 1927
- Adams Prize, 1935
- Fellow of the Royal Society, 1937
- Worked at the Aerodynamics Division, National Physical Laboratory, 1939–45
- Chairman, Aeronautical Research Council, 1946–49
- Foreign Member, Royal Netherlands Academy of Sciences and Letters (Section for Sciences), 1950
- Plenary Speaker, International Congress of Mathematicians, 1954
- Timoshenko Medal, 1965
- Foreign Member, Finnish Scientific Society (Section for maths and physics), 1975

== Selected publications ==
- Modern Developments in Fluid Dynamics, 1938. (Editor)
- Lectures on Fluid Mechanics, 1960.

== See also ==
- Taylor–Goldstein equation

Preceded by Douglas Hartree	Beyer Chair of Applied Mathematics at University of Manchester; 1945–1950	Succeeded by James Lighthill
