= Nicholas Higham =

British numerical analyst (1961–2024)

Nick Higham
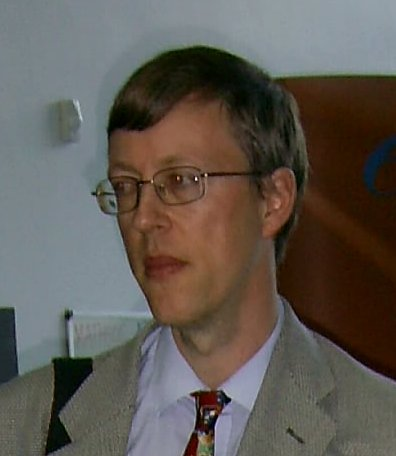
- Higham in 2007
- Born: Nicholas John Higham; 25 December 1961; Salford, England
- Died: 20 January 2024 (aged 62)
- Citizenship: United Kingdom
- Education: University of Manchester
- Awards: Alston Householder Award VI (1987); Leslie Fox Prize for Numerical Analysis (1988); Junior Whitehead Prize (1999); Fellow of the Royal Society (2007); Fröhlich Prize (2008); SIAM Fellow (2009); Naylor Prize and Lectureship (2019); IMA Gold Medal (2020); ACM Fellow (2020); George Pólya Prize for Mathematical Exposition (2021); Hans Schneider Prize in Linear Algebra (2022); Fellow of the Royal Academy of Engineering (2022)
- Scientific career
- Fields: Mathematics; Numerical analysis; Numerical linear algebra; Mathematical software
- Workplaces: University of Manchester; Cornell University
- Thesis: Nearness Problems in Numerical Linear Algebra (1985)
- Doctoral advisor: George Hall
- Website: nhigham.com

Nicholas John Higham (25 December 1961 – 20 January 2024) was a British numerical analyst. He was Royal Society Research Professor and Richardson Professor of Applied Mathematics in the Department of Mathematics at the University of Manchester.

== Early life and career ==
Nicholas John Higham was born in Salford on 25 December 1961. He was educated at Eccles Grammar School, Eccles College, and the University of Manchester, from which he gained his B.Sc. in mathematics (1982), M.Sc. in Numerical Analysis and Computing (1983), and PhD in Numerical Analysis (1985). His PhD thesis was supervised by George Hall. He was appointed lecturer in mathematics at the University of Manchester in 1985, where he has been Richardson Professor of Applied Mathematics since 1998.

In 1988–1989 he was Visiting Assistant Professor of Computer Science at Cornell University, Ithaca, New York.

== Research ==
Higham is best known for his work on the accuracy and stability of numerical algorithms. He has more than 140 refereed publications on topics such as rounding error analysis, linear systems, least squares problems, matrix functions and nonlinear matrix equations, matrix nearness problems, condition number estimation, and generalized eigenvalue problems. He has contributed software to LAPACK and the NAG library, and has contributed code included in the MATLAB distribution.

Higham's books include Functions of Matrices: Theory and Computation (2008),Accuracy and Stability of Numerical Algorithms, Handbook of Writing for the Mathematical Sciences, and MATLAB Guide, co-authored with his brother Desmond Higham. He was Editor of the Princeton Companion to Applied Mathematics and a contributor to the Penguin Dictionary of Mathematics. His books have been translated into Chinese, Japanese and Korean.

== Professional service ==
Higham served as president of the Society for Industrial and Applied Mathematics (SIAM) 2017–2018.

== Death ==
Higham died on 20 January 2024 at the age of 62, after an 18 month struggle with a form of blood cancer.

== Awards and honours ==
Higham's honours include the Alston S. Householder Award VI, 1987 (for the best PhD thesis in numerical algebra 1984–1987), the 1988 Leslie Fox Prize for Numerical Analysis, a 1999 Junior Whitehead Prize from the London Mathematical Society, a 2020 IMA Gold Medal, the 2019 Naylor Prize and Lectureship by the London Mathematical Society, the 2021 George Pólya Prize for Mathematical Exposition by the Society for Industrial and Applied Mathematics (SIAM), and the 2022 Hans Schneider Prize in Linear Algebra. Higham held a prestigious Royal Society Wolfson Research Merit Award (2003–2008). He was elected as a Fellow of the Royal Society in 2007 and as a ACM Fellow in 2020. In 2008 he was awarded the Fröhlich Prize in recognition of 'his leading contributions to numerical linear algebra and numerical stability analysis'. He was elected a Member of Academia Europaea in 2016. In 2022 he became Fellow of the Royal Academy of Engineering.

Higham was a Fellow of the Institute of Mathematics and Its Applications, a Fellow of the Institute of Engineering and Technology, and a Fellow of the Society for Industrial and Applied Mathematics. He was also a Fellow of the Alan Turing Institute.
