= Pólya Prize (LMS) =

The Pólya Prize is a prize in mathematics, awarded by the London Mathematical Society. Second only to the triennial De Morgan Medal in prestige among the society's awards, it is awarded in the years that are not divisible by three – those in which the De Morgan Medal is not awarded. First given in 1987, the prize is named after Hungarian mathematician George Pólya, who was a member of the society for over 60 years.

The prize is awarded "in recognition of outstanding creativity in, imaginative exposition of, or distinguished contribution to, mathematics within the United Kingdom". It cannot be given to anyone who has previously received the De Morgan Medal.

== List of winners ==
- 1987 John Horton Conway
- 1988 C. T. C. Wall
- 1990 Graeme B. Segal
- 1991 Ian G. Macdonald
- 1993 David Rees
- 1994 David Williams
- 1996 David Edmunds
- 1997 John Hammersley
- 1999 Simon Donaldson
- 2000 Terence Lyons
- 2002 Nigel Hitchin
- 2003 Angus Macintyre
- 2005 Michael Berry
- 2006 Peter Swinnerton-Dyer
- 2008 David Preiss
- 2009 Roger Heath-Brown
- 2011 E. Brian Davies
- 2012 Dan Segal
- 2014 Miles Reid
- 2015 Boris Zilber
- 2017 Alex Wilkie
- 2018 Karen Vogtmann
- 2020 Martin W. Liebeck
- 2021 Ehud Hrushovski
- 2023 Frances Kirwan
- 2024 Gui-Qiang Chen

== See also ==
- List of mathematics awards
