= Zoé Chatzidakis =

French mathematician (1955–2025)

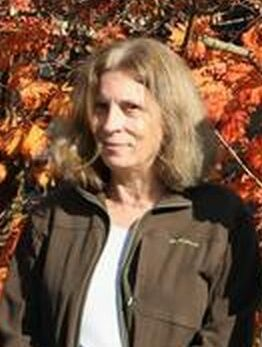
- Born: Zoé Maria Chatzidakis; 3 April 1955
- Died: 22 January 2025 (aged 69); Paris, France
- Education: Yale University
- Awards: Leconte Prize (2013) Tarski Lectures (2020)
- Scientific career
- Fields: Mathematics, Model theory, Algebra
- Workplaces: École normale supérieure
- Thesis: Model Theory of Profinite Groups (1984)
- Doctoral advisor: Angus Macintyre

Zoé Maria Chatzidakis (3 April 1955 – 22 January 2025) was a French mathematician who worked as a director of research at the École Normale Supérieure in Paris, France.

== Life and career ==
Chatzidakis was born on 3 April 1955. She earned her Ph.D. in 1984 from Yale University, under the supervision of Angus Macintyre, with a dissertation on the model theory of profinite groups. She was Senior researcher and team director in Algebra and Geometry in the Département de mathématiques et applications de l'École Normale Supérieure.

Her research concerned model theory and difference algebra. She was invited to give the Tarski Lectures in 2020, though the lectures were postponed due to the COVID-19 pandemic.

Chatzidakis died on 22 January 2025 in Paris at the age of 69.

== Honours and awards ==
Chatzidakis was the 2013 winner of the Leconte Prize, and was an invited speaker at the International Congress of Mathematicians in 2014. She was named MSRI Chern Professor for Fall 2020.
