= Department of Mathematics, University of Manchester =

Academic faculty in north-west England

Coordinates: 53°28′04″N 2°13′53″W

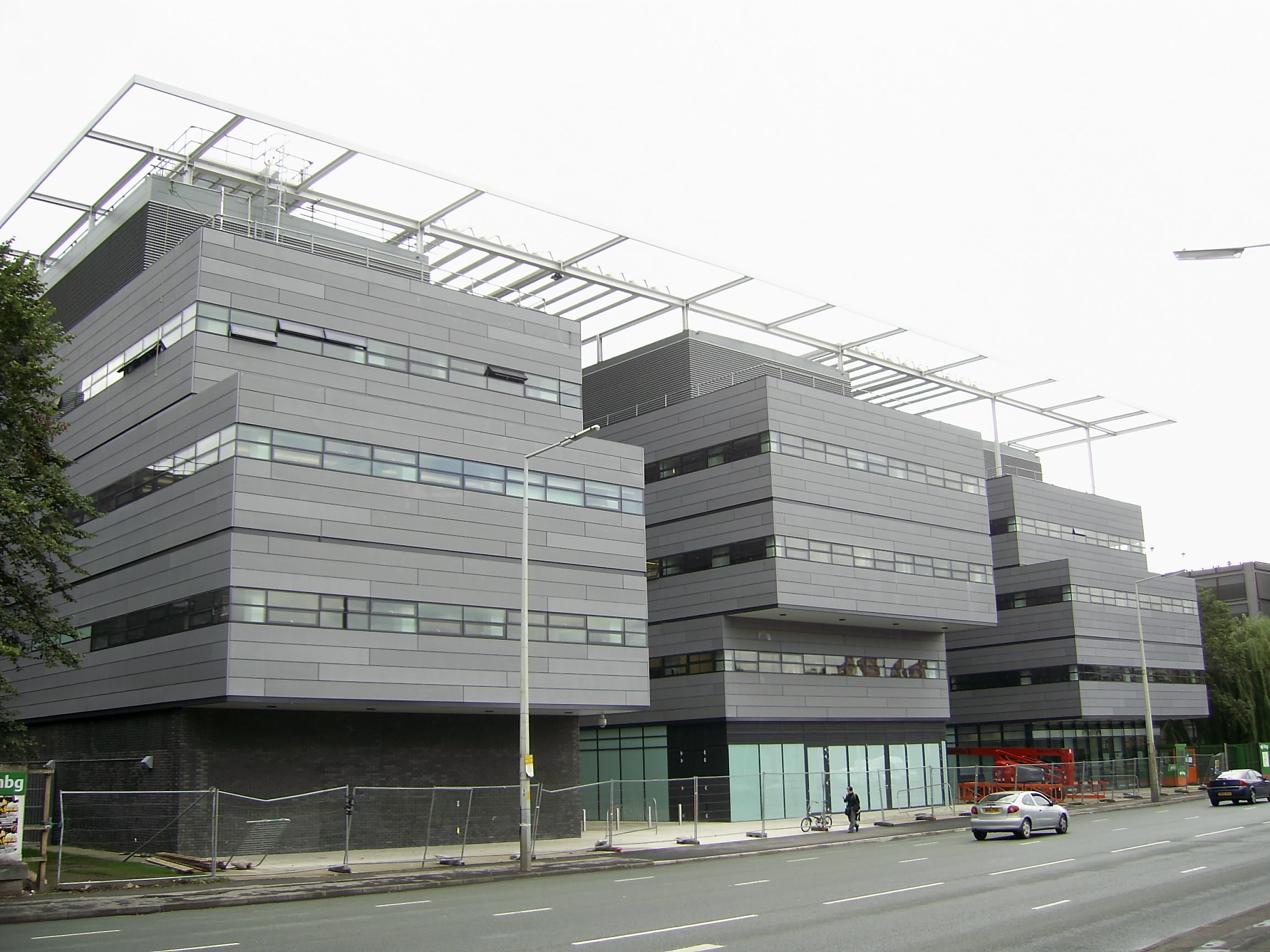
The Alan Turing Building. Home of the School of Mathematics from July 2007

The Department of Mathematics at the University of Manchester is one of the largest unified mathematics departments in the United Kingdom, with over 90 academic staff and an undergraduate intake of roughly 400 students per year (including students studying mathematics with a minor in another subject) and approximately 200 postgraduate students in total. The School of Mathematics was formed in 2004 by the merger of the mathematics departments of University of Manchester Institute of Science and Technology (UMIST) and the Victoria University of Manchester (VUM). In July 2007 the department moved into a purpose-designed building─the first three floors of the Alan Turing Building─on Upper Brook Street. In a Faculty restructure in 2019 the School of Mathematics reverted to the Department of Mathematics. It is one of five Departments that make up the School of Natural Sciences, which together with the School of Engineering now constitutes the Faculty of Science and Engineering at Manchester.

== Organization ==
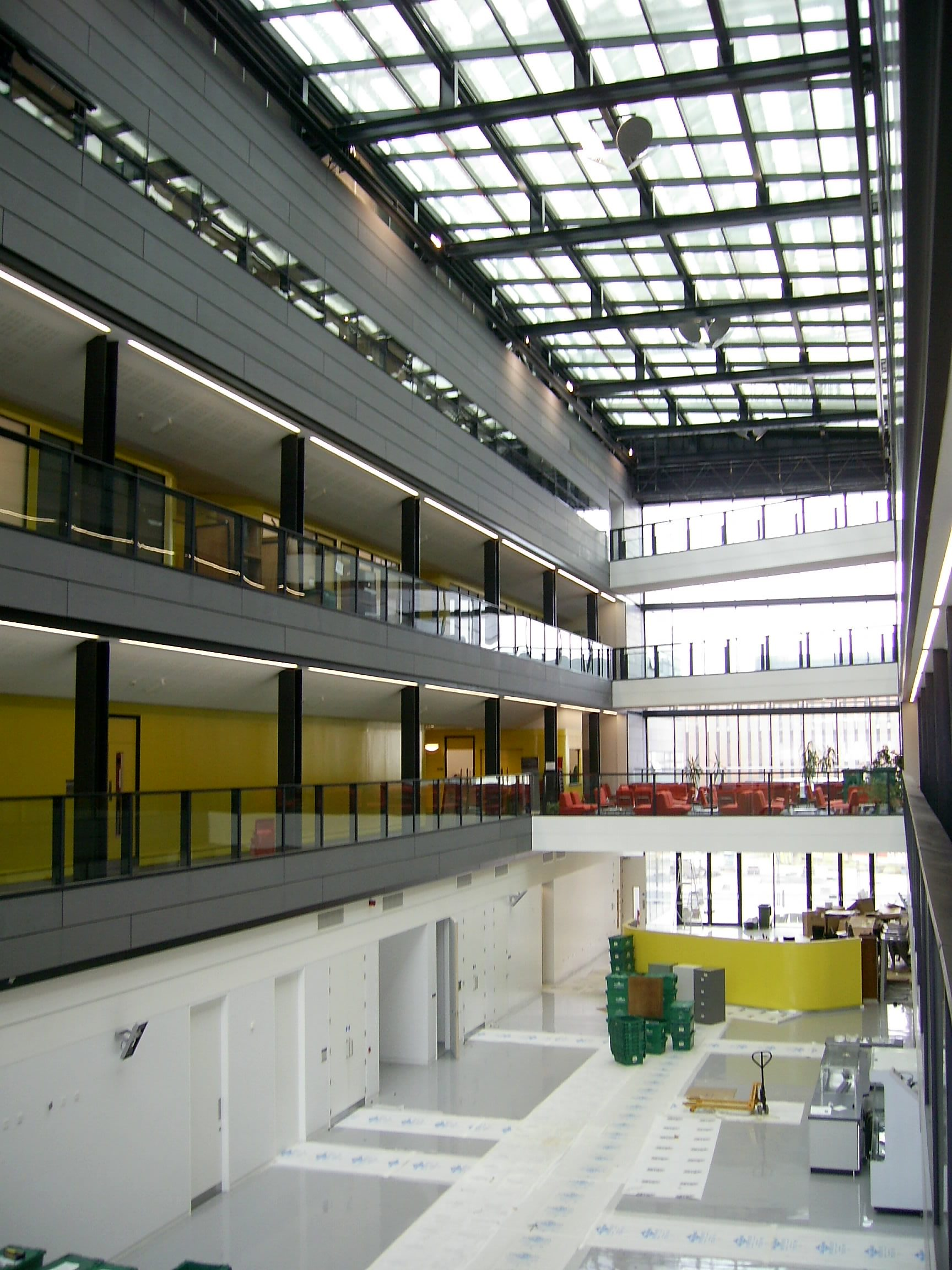
The atrium of the Alan Turing Building

The current head of the department is Andrew Hazel. The department is divided into three groups: Pure Mathematics (Head: Gareth Jones), Applied Mathematics (Head: Sergei Fedotov), and Probability and Statistics (Head: Korbinian Strimmer). The director of research is Mark Kambites.

The Manchester Institute for Mathematical Sciences (MIMS) is a unit of the department focusing on the organising of mathematical colloquia and conferences, and research visitors. MIMS was headed by Nick Higham. Other high-profile mathematicians at Manchester recently included Martin Taylor and Jeff Paris.

Since its formation, the department has made some influential appointments including the topologist Viktor Buchstaber and model theorist Alex Wilkie. Numerical analyst Jack Dongarra, one of the authors of LINPACK, was appointed in 2007 as Turing Fellow. In the autumn of 2007, Albert Shiryaev was appointed to a 20% chair. Shiryaev is known for his work on probability theory (he was a student of Andrey Kolmogorov) and for his work on financial mathematics.

== Research ==
As might be expected from its size (about 30 academic staff in Probability & Statistics, 30 in Pure Mathematics and 45 in Applied Mathematics), the department has a wide range of research interests, including the traditionally pure areas of algebra, analysis, noncommutative geometry, ergodic theory, mathematical logic, number theory, geometry and topology; and the more applied dynamical system, fluid dynamics, solid mechanics, inverse problems, mathematical finance, wave propagation and scattering. The department also has a strong tradition in numerical analysis and well established groups in Probability theory, and Mathematical statistics.

Manchester mathematicians have a long tradition of applying mathematics to industrial problems. Nowadays this involves not only the traditional applications in engineering and the physical sciences, but also in the life sciences and the financial sector. Some of the recent industrial partners include Qinetiq, Hewlett Packard, NAg, MathWorks, Comsol, Philips Labs, Thales Underwater Systems, Rapiscan Systems and Schlumberger.

=== Research Assessment Exercise (2008) ===
The department of Mathematics entered research into three units of assessment. In Pure Mathematics 20% of submissions from 27 FTE category A staff were rated 4* (World Class) and 40% 3* (Internationally Excellent). In Applied Mathematics 25% of submissions from 28.8 FTE category A staff were rated 4* and 35%, 3*. And in Statistics and Operational Research, 20% of submissions from 10.9 FTE category A staff were rated 4* and 35%, 3*.

== History ==
At the time of merger the two departments that came together to form the school were of roughly equal sizes and academic strengths, and already had a substantial record of collaboration including shared research seminar programmes and fourth year undergraduate and MSc programmes.

Many famous mathematicians have worked at the precursor departments to the department.

In 1885 Horace Lamb, famous for his contribution to fluid dynamics accepted a chair at the VUM and under his leadership the department grew rapidly. Newman wrote:

'His lecture courses were numerous, and his books provide a record of his methods. Many of his students were engineers, and they found in him a sympathetic guide, one who understood their difficulties and shared their interest in applications of mathematics to mechanics.'

In 1907 famous analyst and number theorist John Edensor Littlewood was appointed to the Richardson Lectureship which he held for three years.

During 1912–1913 the pioneer of weather forecasting and numerical analysis Lewis Fry Richardson worked at Manchester College of Science and Technology (later to become UMIST). Number theorist Louis J. Mordell joined the College in 1920. During this time he discovered the result for which he is best known, namely the finite basis theorem (or Mordell–Weil theorem), which proved a conjecture of Henri Poincaré. Mordell then went on to become Fielden Reader in Pure Mathematics at VUM in 1922 and then held the Fielden Chair in 1923. Mordell built up the department, offering posts to a number of outstanding mathematicians who had been forced from posts on the continent of Europe. He brought in Reinhold Baer, G. Billing, Paul Erdős, Chao Ko, Kurt Mahler, and Beniamino Segre. He also recruited J. A. Todd, Patrick du Val, Harold Davenport, L. C. Young, and invited distinguished visitors.

Although Manchester was later to be known as the birthplace of the electronic computer, Douglas Hartree made an earlier contribution building a differential analyser in 1933. The machine was used for ballistics calculations as well calculating railway timetables.

Mordell was succeeded by the famous topologist and cryptanalyst Max Newman in 1945 who, as head of department, transformed it into a centre of international renown. Undergraduate numbers increased from eight per year to 40 and then 60. In 1948 Newman recruited Alan Turing as Reader in the department, and he worked there until his death in 1954, completing some of his profound work on the foundations of computer science including Computing Machinery and Intelligence. Newman retired in 1964. From 1949 to 1960 M. S. Bartlett held the first chair in mathematical statistics at VUM, he is known for his contribution to the analysis of data with spatial and temporal patterns, the theory of statistical inference and in multivariate analysis. At Manchester he developed an interest in epidemiology, building a strong group in mathematical statistics and strengthening the department.

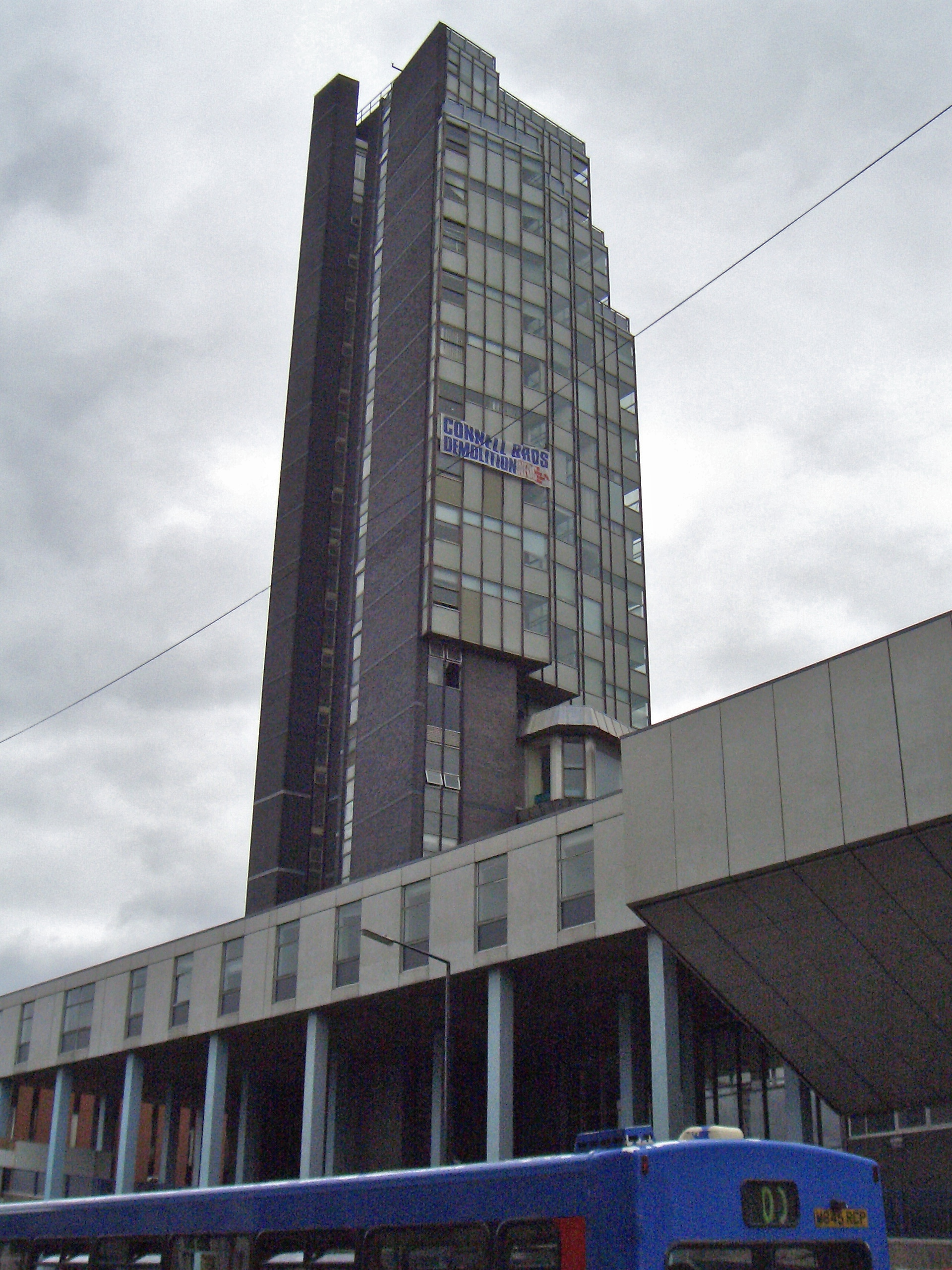
The VUM Mathematics Tower prior to its demolition

Fluid dynamicist Sydney Goldstein held the Beyer Chair of Applied Mathematics from 1945 to 1950, and was succeeded from 1950 to 1959 by James Lighthill, also a fluid dynamicist. In pure mathematics, Bernhard Neumann, an influential group theorist, joined the department at VUM in 1948, leaving as a Reader in 1961 to take a chair in Australia. In 1969, VUM's Mathematics Tower, an 18-storey skyscraper on Oxford Road, was completed.

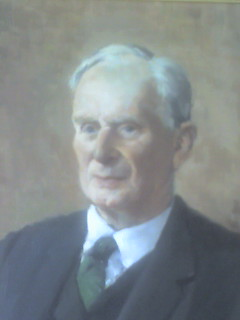
Frank Bowman was the longest serving head of Mathematics at UMIST: 1933–1957. This portrait was presented to the department by the Royal Society of Chemistry

Up until the 1950s, UMIST's Mathematics Department taught largely service courses for the engineering and applied science courses, and despite stars such as Richardson, Mordell and in 1958–1963 group theorist Hanna Neumann, did not have a strong focus on research. Neumann was later to be the first woman appointed to a Professorial Chair of Mathematics in Australia.

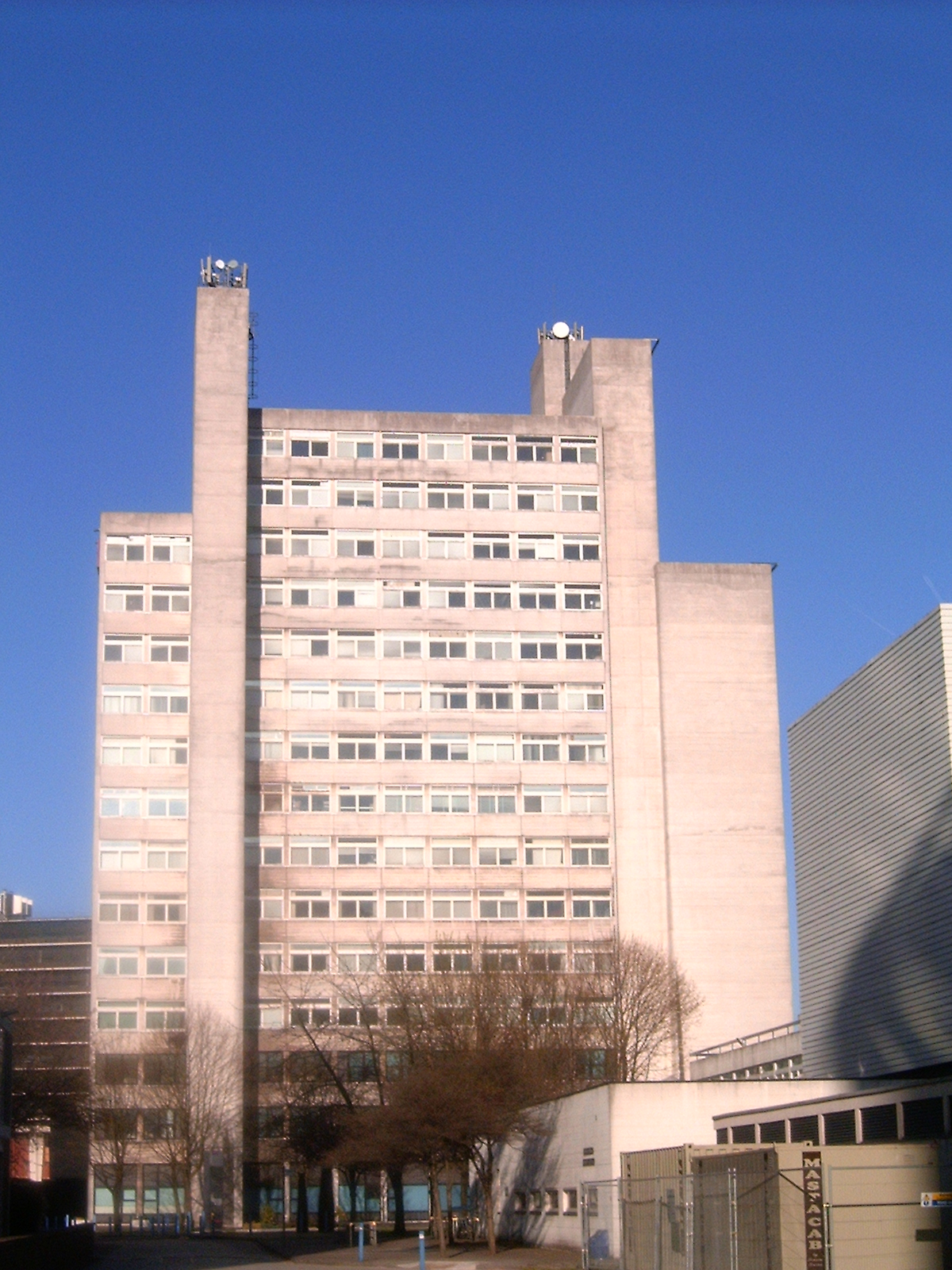
The Maths and Social Sciences Building, which housed the UMIST Department of Mathematics from 1968 until merger, and part of the merged department until the opening of the Alan Turing Building in July 2007

With the rapid expansion of higher education and the starting of an undergraduate mathematics degree this changed, and by 1968 the 15-storey Maths and Social Sciences Building (MSS) was completed on UMIST campus to house the growing department. In 1960 Robin Bullough joined the UMIST department initiating four decades of mathematical physics focusing especially on solitons. The statistics group also grew in strength with an emphasis on time series, led by Maurice Priestley and also Tata Subba Rao. In 1971, Violet Cane became the first woman appointed Professor in Mathematical Statistics, and the first woman appointed as a professor in the Faculty of Science. In 1986 pure mathematics at UMIST was strengthened by the appointment of Martin J. Taylor FRS, famous for his work on properties and structures of algebraic numbers.

Another renowned topologist, Frank Adams, succeeded Newman in the Fielden Chair, which he held from 1964 to 1970.

The VUM Mathematics tower was demolished in 2005, with most of the staff moving to temporary buildings, the pure mathematicians to one named after Newman and the applied to one named after Lamb. The history of the department entered a new phase in July 2007 with the move to the Alan Turing Building. The department was known as the School of Mathematics until a 2019 faculty-wide restructuring.

In 2013, the Sir Horace Lamb Chair was founded in memory of Sir Horace Lamb. The chair was inaugurated in May 2013 with the appointment of Professor Oliver Jensen, who already held a personal chair in the school.

== See also ==
- Mathematics section in People Associated with the University of Manchester
- Richardson Professor of Applied Mathematics
- Fielden Professor of Pure Mathematics
- Beyer Professor of Applied Mathematics
