= Alan Turing Building =

Building at the University of Manchester

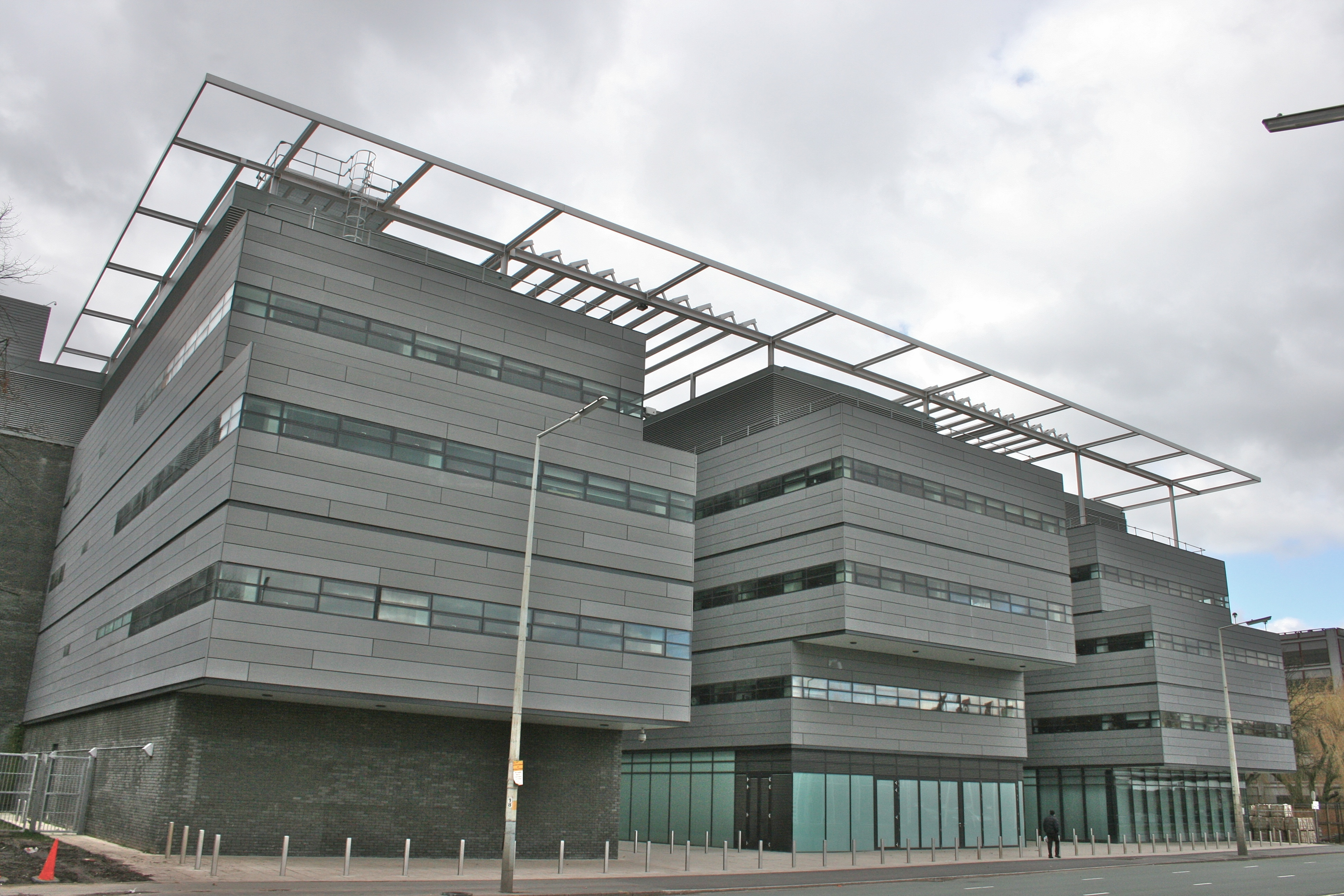
- Former names: AMPPS

General information
- Type: Educational
- Location: Manchester, United Kingdom
- Coordinates: 53°28′05″N 2°13′53″W
- Completed: 2007
- Owner: University of Manchester

Technical details
- Floor count: 5
- Floor area: 17,000 m^{2}

Design and construction
- Architect: Sheppard Robson
- Services engineer: Emcor Engineering
- Main contractor: HBG Construction
- Awards: 2007 NW Regional Construction Award for Sustainability – Winner, Considerate Constructor – Gold Award. Building & Engineer Awards 2007 – Public Project of the Year – Finalist, Building & Engineer Awards 2007 – Energy Efficient Project of the Year – Finalist, RICS North West Awards 2008 – Sustainability – Finalist Chartered Institute of Building "Construction Manager of the Year" – Silver.

The Alan Turing Building is a building in Manchester, England that is home to the Department of Mathematics at the University of Manchester. Named after the mathematician and pioneer of Computer Science and Artificial Intelligence, Alan Turing, the building also houses the Photon Science Institute and the Jodrell Bank Centre for Astrophysics (JBCA), part of the Department of Physics and Astronomy, University of Manchester. Located in the Chorlton-on-Medlock district of Manchester, on Upper Brook Street, the building is adjacent the Henry Royce Institute, Kilburn Building and University Place.

While under construction, the project was known as AMPPS : Astronomy, Mathematics, Physics and Photon Science. The building was shortlisted for the Greater Manchester Building of the Year 2008 prize, which is awarded by the Greater Manchester Chamber of Commerce. The manager of the building project was awarded a silver medal in the Chartered Institute of Building "Construction Manager of the Year" awards.

== Architecture ==
The £43m building was completed in July 2007, and was designed by architects Sheppard Robson. It consists of three "fingers", each of which are four storeys high. The building is of steel frame construction, with reinforced concrete stairwells, and grey zinc exterior cladding.

The northern two fingers are joined by an atrium, which is spanned by a series of bridges. The southernmost finger was designed to hold low vibration laboratories, and is joined by a glazed bridge at third-floor level to the middle finger.

An 'over-sailing' roof structure connects the three fingers acting as a suspension system for a photovoltaic array/solar shading using thin film technology. This photovoltaic array is designed to produce nearly 41 megawatt hours per annum, a saving of 17,000 kilograms of carbon dioxide each year. At the time of completion this was the largest photovoltaic array in North West England, and helped the architects to win an award for "Business Commitment to the Environment".

One condition for planning approval was that the project included corridors for pedestrian access and visual transparency between Upper Brook Street and Oxford Road. This was to counter complaints by the residents of Brunswick, on the other side of Upper Brook Street, that previous university developments seemed to be creating a wall to them. The pedestrian walkway between the second and third finger, and the transparent atrium met these demands. This follows the line of an earlier street, when the site was a residential area, and runs from Upper Brook Street to Oxford Road and is called "Wilton Street", as it was historically.

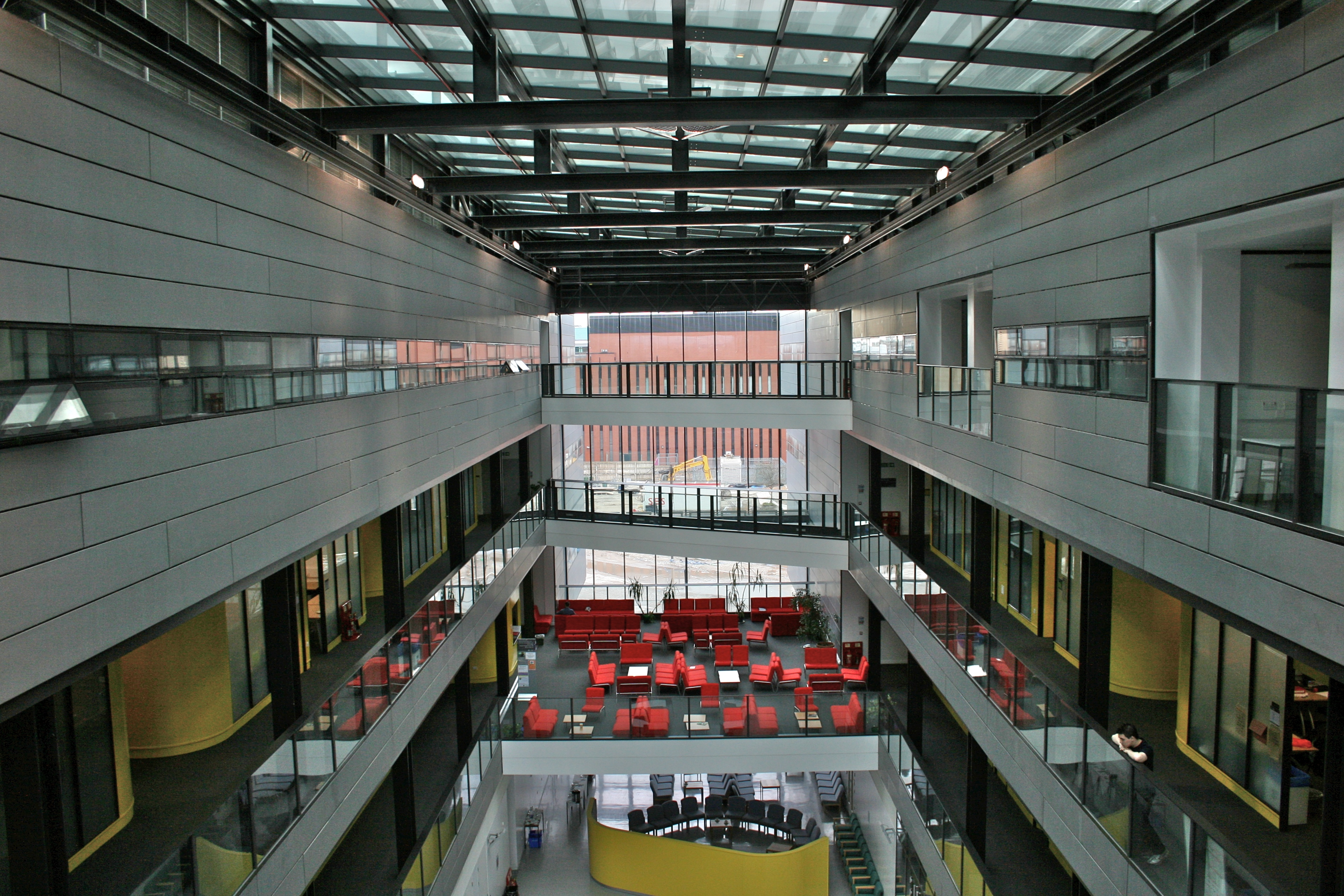
The atrium looking down from the third floor

In the 1960s, many mathematics departments were housed in high-rise buildings including the Mathematics Tower at the Victoria University of Manchester, and the Maths and Social Sciences Building at UMIST. These proved completely unsuited to the activities of a mathematics department (and arguably any academic department) as travel between floors in lifts (and uninviting stairways) discourages interaction between mathematicians resulting from chance encounter. Buildings such as the Mathematics Institute at Warwick (at East Site and later the Zeeman Building) and the Isaac Newton Institute at Cambridge are deliberately low-rise and designed to encourage chance encounters. The Alan Turing Building was designed with substantial input from the mathematicians, and the design reflects this including a large open-plan common room on the atrium bridge, open corridors and walkways and the relocation of the best traditional blackboards from the old buildings.

== Occupancy and facilities ==
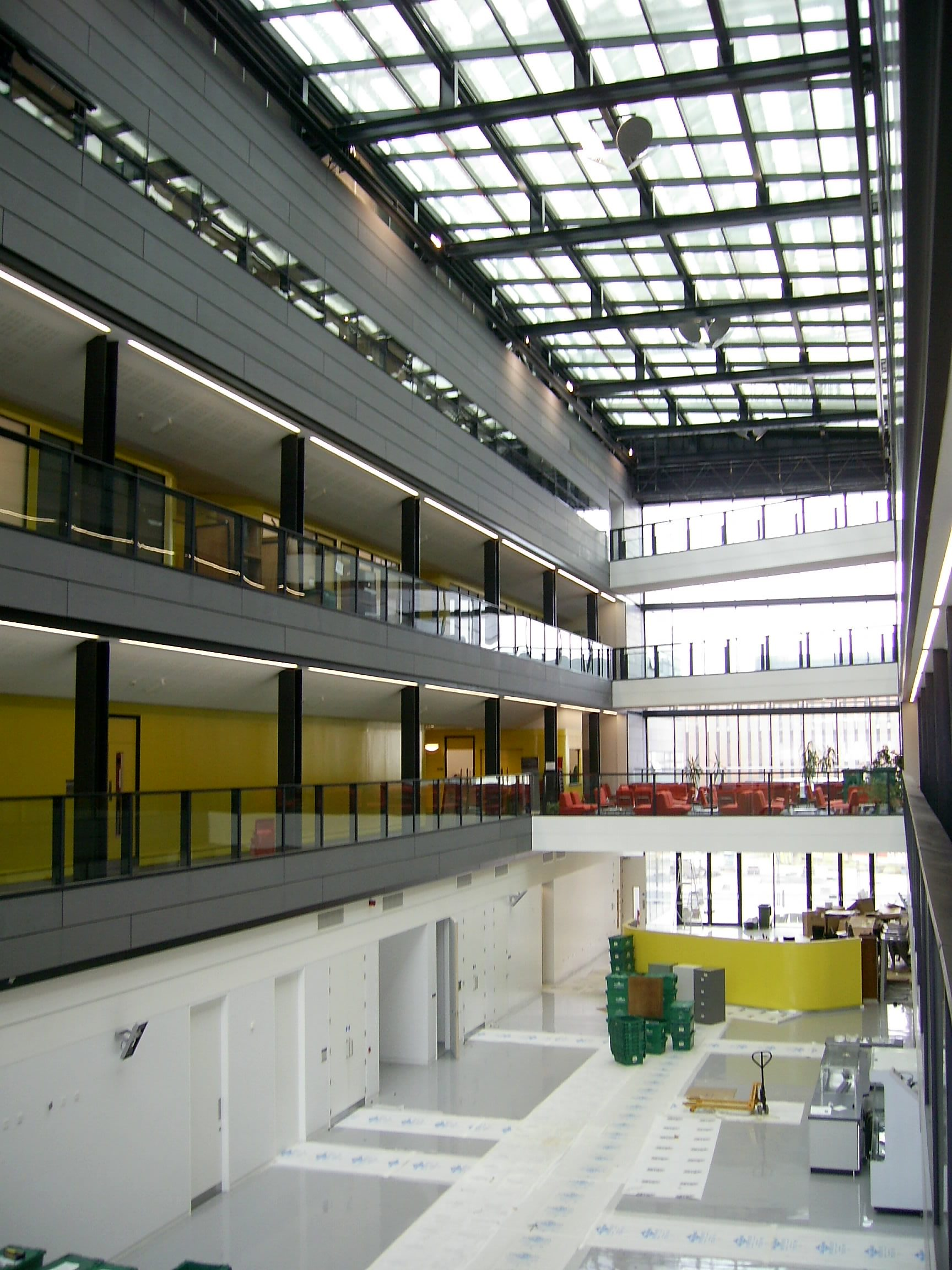
The Atrium, during the move of the School of Mathematics

The Photon Science Institute occupies the southernmost finger, with the northern two fingers housing Mathematics on the first three floors and the JBCA on the third and fourth floors. The ground floor atrium constitutes a public space including a small café called Code.

Surrounding the atrium on the ground floor are the undergraduate common room for mathematics, as well as lecture rooms and undergraduate computer rooms. The first and second floor of the first two fingers mainly house the offices of academic staff and postgraduate students in mathematics, as well as the Manchester Institute for Mathematical Science (MIMS) conference areas. One of seminar rooms is named after the topologist Frank Adams, and the library after algebraist Brian Hartley. Lecture theatres are named after Mordell, Richardson, Max Newman and Lighthill. A meeting room is named after Horace Lamb and the Access Grid room after Sydney Goldstein. The bridge across the atrium is the common room for mathematics academics and graduate students, where morning coffee is served.

The third floor houses the academic offices of the JBCA, which provides a new base for the research activities in astronomy and astrophysics with the relocation of many staff and students from Jodrell Bank Observatory. The Observatory now forms part of the JBCA and provides leading observational facilities such as the Lovell Telescope and the Multi-Element Radio Linked Interferometer Network (MERLIN). This floor differs in design from the others in that the rooms have windows onto the atrium and glass walls to central corridors in each wing, whilst retaining glass walled walkways across the atrium. The astrophysics seminar room is named after Sir Bernard Lovell, founder of Jodrell Bank Observatory. The fourth floor contains a number of labs, an RFI screened room and clean room, all for astrophysics instrumentation construction, such as receivers for the Lovell Telescope and the Planck spacecraft. In January 2008, the Project Design Office for the Square Kilometre Array relocated to Manchester to be hosted by the JBCA, co-ordinating the global efforts in constructing the next generation radio telescope.

The Photon Science Institute houses laboratories shielded from electromagnetic radiation and resistant to vibration, and features instruments such as a broadband sum frequency spectrometer, and a spectroscopic photon echo measurement kit. A bridge on the third floor connects from Astrophysics to the Photon Science Institute, but retaining that finger's resistance to mechanical vibration.

Gömböc 1824 on the ground floor of Alan Turing Building

The Alan Turing Building is home to Gömböc number 1824, an object with one stable and one unstable equilibrium point. This was given to the University of Manchester in October 2024 to mark the 200th anniversary of the university's foundation. Gömböc 1824 is the first to be given to an institution in the north-west of England.
