= Maths and Social Sciences Building =

University building at the University of Manchester

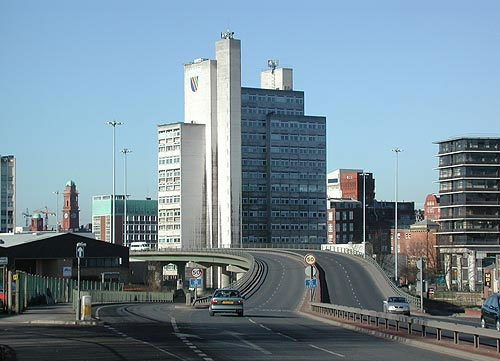
- The Mathematics and Social Sciences Building from Mancunian Way
- Interactive map of the Maths and Social Sciences Building area

General information
- Status: In Use as of 2015
- Type: Academic
- Architectural style: Brutalist
- Location: Manchester
- Coordinates: 53.4742°N 2.231166°W
- Completed: 1969
- Owner: University of Manchester

Height
- Height: 50 metres

Technical details
- Floor count: 15

Design and construction
- Architecture firm: Cruikshank and Seward

The Maths and Social Sciences Building is a high-rise tower in Manchester, England. It was part of the University of Manchester Institute of Science and Technology (UMIST) until that university merged with the Victoria University of Manchester, to form the University of Manchester, in 2004. It was vacated by the university in 2010 but was in use by the School of Materials while waiting for a new building to be constructed; this new building is the Nancy Rothwell Building.

== History ==
The MSS Building was built in 1969, as part of the UMIST campus. Constructed from reinforced concrete and designed by architects Cruikshank and Seward, it has fifteen stories and an overall height of 50 metres (160 ft), making it the tallest building on the former UMIST campus. Unlike many examples of Brutalist architecture on university campuses of that period, the building deviates from a purely cuboid outline with decorative towers at either end (now used as convenient locations for mobile phone antennae) and the floors up to the 10th being larger, which also breaks up the outline. The building was used largely for staff offices, with some teaching rooms. The 10th to 14th floors (called floors M–Q) accommodated the Department of Mathematics. The University of Manchester Regional Computer Centre (UMRCC) was based on J floor. The "Social Sciences" in the building's name indicates that the building once housed the Management Department, but in recent years the Department of Computation occupied the lower floors of the building. They were to become the School of Informatics in the new university and have since been split between the Schools of Computer Science and Manchester Business School. A two-floor annex to the MSS building connected to the ground floor houses tiered lecture theatres.

It was built on the site of cramped terraced housing that accommodated factory workers that was studied by Friedrich Engels in his book The Condition of the Working Class in England in 1844.

The new, merged University of Manchester announced in June 2007 that it planned to sell the Mathematics and Social Sciences Building. In July 2007, School of Mathematics relocated from MSS as well as from the Ferranti Building and the temporary buildings Newman and Lamb, to the new purpose-designed Alan Turing Building. Later in 2007, the staff of the former School of Informatics relocated, some of them to the Lamb building vacated by the mathematicians.

As of 2015, the building houses the Materials Science department, recently relocated from the old Materials Science Building, awaiting demolition. The site has since had the Nancy Rothwell Building built on it.
