= Alex Wilkie =

British mathematician

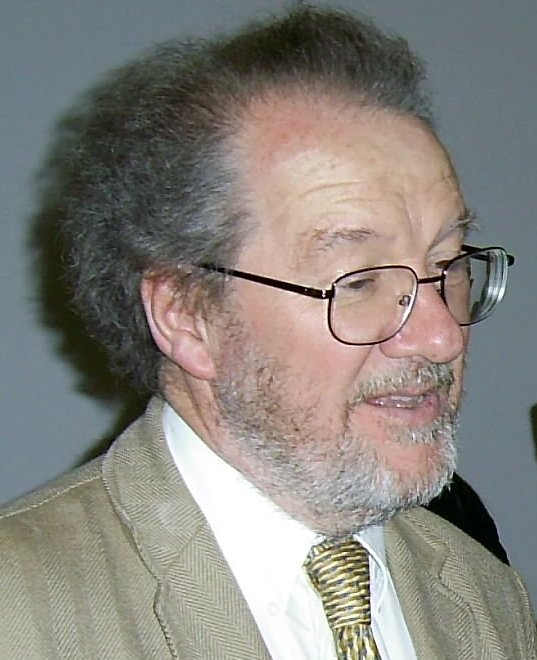
- Wilkie, pictured in 2007
- Born: Alex James Wilkie; 1948 (age 77–78); Northampton, England
- Education: University College London; Bedford College, University of London
- Known for: Wilkie's theorem
- Awards: Karp Prize (1993); Fellow of the Royal Society (2001); Pólya Prize (LMS) (2017)
- Scientific career
- Fields: Mathematics, Model theory
- Workplaces: University of Manchester
- Doctoral advisor: Wilfrid Hodges

Alex James Wilkie FRS (born 1948 in Northampton) is a British mathematician known for his contributions to model theory and logic. Previously Reader in Mathematical Logic at the University of Oxford, he was appointed to the Fielden Chair of Pure Mathematics at the University of Manchester in 2007.

== Education ==
Alex Wilkie attended Aylesbury Grammar School and went on to gain his BSc in mathematics with first class honours from University College London in 1969, his MSc (in mathematical logic) from the University of London in 1970, and his PhD from the Bedford College, University of London in 1973 under the supervision of Wilfrid Hodges with a dissertation titled Models of Number Theory.

== Career and research ==
After his doctoral research he was appointment as a lecturer in mathematics at Leicester University from 1972 to 1973, then a research fellow at the Open University from 1973 until 1978. He spent two periods as a junior lecturer in mathematics at Oxford University (1978–80 and 1981-2) with (1980–1) as a visiting assistant professor at Yale University. In 1980 Wilkie solved Tarski's high school algebra problem.

In October 1982 Wilkie was appointed as a research fellow in the department of mathematics at the University of Paris VII, then returned to England the following year to take up a three-year SERC (now EPSRC) advanced research fellowship at the University of Manchester. After two years he was appointed lecturer in the Department of Mathematics. In 1986 he went on to Oxford where he was appointed to the readership in mathematical logic there which had become vacant upon the retirement of Robin Gandy. He remained in this post until appointment to the Fielden Chair at Manchester.

== Awards and honours ==
Wilkie was elected a Fellow of the Royal Society (FRS) in 2001. To quote the citation

Wilkie has combined logical techniques and differential-geometric techniques to establish fundamental Finiteness Theorems for sets definable using the exponential function, and more general Pfaffian functions. The results, going far beyond those obtained by conventional methods, have already had striking applications to Lie groups.

Wilkie received the Carol Karp Prize (the highest award made by the Association for Symbolic Logic, every five years) jointly with Ehud Hrushovski in 1993. He was elected to the Council of the London Mathematical Society in 2007, vice-president of the Association for Symbolic Logic (2006) and president of the Association for Symbolic Logic in 2009. In 2012 he became a fellow of the American Mathematical Society. He received the Karp Prize again in 2013, jointly with Moti Gitik, Ya'acov Peterzil, Jonathan Pila, and Sergei Starchenko. In 2017, Wilkie was awarded the Pólya Prize.

He was an Invited Speaker of the International Congress of Mathematicians in Berkeley in 1986 and in Berlin in 1998.

In 2015, Wilkie held the Gödel Lecture titled Complex continuations of functions definable in $\mathbb{R}_{an, exp}$ with a diophantine application.

Preceded by Mark Pollicott	Fielden Chair of Pure Mathematics; 2007–	Succeeded by Current Holder
