= Anand Pillay =

British logician

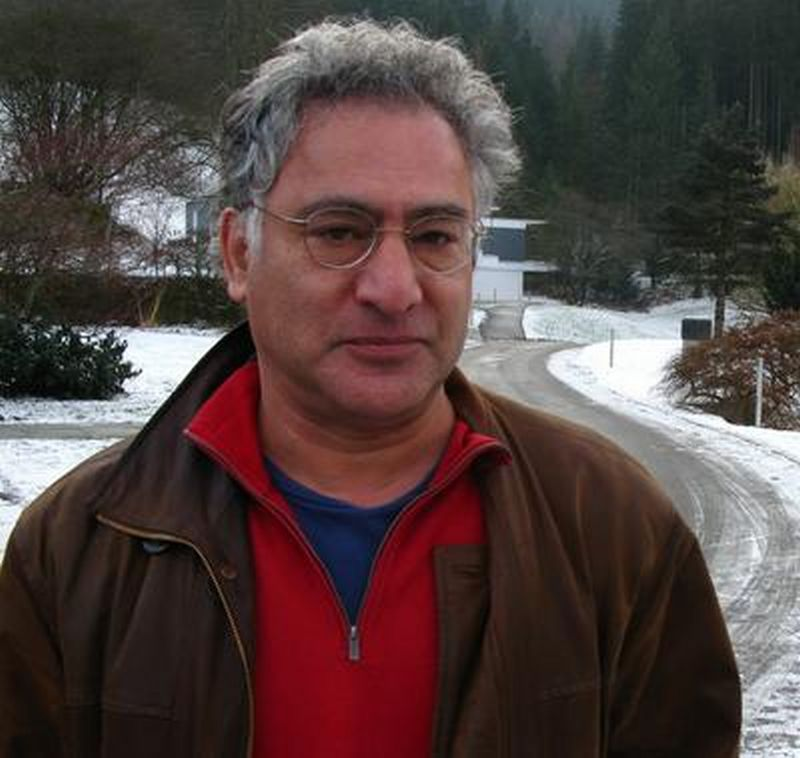
Anand Pillay, Oberwolfach 2010

Anand Pillay (born 7 May 1951) is a British mathematician and logician working in model theory and its applications in algebra and number theory.

== Biography ==
Pillay studied as an undergraduate at the University of Oxford, obtaining a Bachelor in Mathematics and Philosophy in 1973 at Balliol College. At the University of London, he received his master's degree in mathematics in 1974 and his PhD in 1978 with Wilfrid Hodges at Bedford College, titled Gaifman Operations, Minimal Models, and the Number of Countable Models. In 1978, he was a Royal Society Fellow and visiting scientist at CNRS at Paris Diderot University. After teaching at the University of Manchester starting in 1981 and at McGill University in Canada, he joined the University of Notre Dame as an assistant professor in 1983, where he became an associate professor in 1986 and a full professor in 1988. From 1996 to 2006, he was Swanlund Professor at the University of Illinois Urbana-Champaign, where he is now Professor Emeritus. Since 2005, he has been the Chair of Mathematical Logic at the University of Leeds. He also held positions as a visiting scholar at the Fields Institute in Toronto, at the Mathematical Sciences Research Institute in Berkeley, and at the Isaac Newton Institute in Cambridge.

== Career ==
Pillay's dissertation work concerned the number of countable models of countable theories; under the influence of the Paris school of model theory, he also worked on stability theory. Later, he dealt with applications of model theory in other areas of mathematics, including Nash manifolds and groups, algebraic theory of differential equations and differential algebra, classification of compact complex manifolds, and diophantine geometry.

Pillay was an invited speaker at the International Congress of Mathematicians in Zürich in 1994. In 2009 he was invited to present the Tarski Lectures, titled Compact Spaces, Definability, and Measures, in Model Theory. His three lectures were titled "The Logic Topology", "Lie Groups from Nonstandard Models", and "Measures and Domination". In 2001, he received the Humboldt Foundation's research award, and was also a Humboldt Fellow at the University of Kiel in 1988 and at the University of Freiburg in 1992. In 2011, he gave the Gödel Lecture. He is a Fellow of the American Mathematical Society.

== Selected works ==
- An introduction to stability theory (Oxford Logic Guides 8). Clarendon Press, Oxford 1983, ISBN 0-19-853186-9.
- Geometric Stability Theory (Oxford Logic Guides 32). Clarendon Press, Oxford 1996, ISBN 0-19-853437-X.
- with David Marker and Margit Messmer: Model theory of fields (Lecture Notes in Logic 5). Springer, Berlin. 1996, ISBN 3-540-60741-2.
- Model Theory and Diophantine Geometry. In: Bulletin of the American Mathematical Society. Vol. 34, No. 4, 1997, pp. 405–422, doi:10.1090/S0273-0979-97-00730-1.
- Model Theory. In: Notices of the American Mathematical Society. Vol. 47, No. 11, 2000, pp. 1373–1381.
- with Deidre Haskell and Charles Steinhorn (ed.): Model theory, algebra and geometry (Mathematical Sciences Research Institute Publications 39). Cambridge University Press, Cambridge, 2000, ISBN 0-521-78068-3.
