= List of logicians =

A logician is a person who studies logic. Some famous logicians are listed below in English alphabetical transliteration order (by surname).

== A ==
- Peter Abelard (France, 1079–1142)
- Wilhelm Ackermann (Germany, 1896–1962)
- Sergei Adian (Russia/Soviet Union/Armenia, 1931–2020)
- Rodolphus Agricola (Germany, 1443/1444–1485)
- Kazimierz Ajdukiewicz (Poland, 1890–1963)
- Alcuin (England/France, c. 735–804)
- Alan Ross Anderson (US, 1924–1972)
- Peter B. Andrews (US, 1938–2025)
- Thomas Aquinas (Italy/France, 1225–1274)
- Lennart Åqvist (Sweden, 1932-2019)
- Aristotle (Greece, 384–322 BC)
- Heiric of Auxerre (France, 841–876)
- A. J. Ayer (England, 1910–1989)

== B ==
- Bahmanyār (Iran, died 1067)
- Jayanta Bhatta (India, 850–910)
- Alexander Bain (UK, 1818–1903)
- Yehoshua Bar-Hillel (Israel, 1915–1975)
- Ruth Barcan Marcus (US, 1921–2012)
- Henk Barendregt (Netherlands, born 1947)
- Jon Barwise (US, 1942–2000)
- James Earl Baumgartner (US, 1943–2011)
- John Lane Bell (UK and Canada, born 1945)
- Nuel Belnap (US, 1931–2024)
- Paul Benacerraf (US, 1931–2025)
- Jean Paul Van Bendegem (Belgium, born 1953)
- Johan van Benthem (Netherlands, born 1949)
- Paul Bernays (Switzerland, 1888–1977)
- Evert Willem Beth (Netherlands, 1908–1964)
- Jean-Yves Béziau (Switzerland, born 1965)
- Józef Maria Bocheński (Poland, 1902–1995)
- Boethius (Rome/Ostrogothic Kingdom, c. 480–524/525)
- Bernard Bolzano (Austrian Empire, 1781–1848)
- Andrea Bonomi (Italy, born 1940)
- George Boole (England/Ireland, 1815–1864)
- George Boolos (US, 1940–1996)
- Nicolas Bourbaki (pseudonym used by a group of French mathematicians, 20th century)
- Thomas Bradwardine (England, c. 1290–26 August 1349)
- Richard Brinkley (England, died c. 1379)
- Luitzen Egbertus Jan Brouwer (Netherlands, 1881–1966)
- Alan Richard Bundy (UK, born 1947)
- Franco Burgersdijk (Netherlands, 1590–1629)
- Jean Buridan (France, c. 1300–post 1358)
- Walter Burley (England, c. 1275–1344/5)

== C ==
- Chanakya (India, Mouryan Empire, 371–285 BC)
- Georg Ferdinand Cantor (Germany, 1845–1918)
- Rudolf Carnap (Germany, 1891–1970)
- Lewis Carroll (UK, 1832–1898)
- Categoriae decem (Latin, fifth century)
- Gregory Chaitin (Argentina/US, born 1947)
- Chrysippus (Greece, c. 280 BC – c. 207 BC)
- Alonzo Church (US, 1903–1995)
- Leon Chwistek (Poland, 1884–1944)
- Gordon H. Clark (US, 1902–1985)
- Paul Joseph Cohen (US, 1934–2007)
- Conimbricenses, name by which Jesuits of the University of Coimbra (Portugal) were known (1591–1606)
- S. Barry Cooper (UK, 1943–2015)
- Jack Copeland (UK, born 1950)
- Thierry Coquand (France, born 1961)
- John Corcoran (US, 1937–2021)
- Newton da Costa (Brazil, 1929–2024)
- William Craig (US, 1918–2016)
- Haskell Curry (US, 1900–1982)
- Tadeusz Czeżowski (Poland, 1889–1981)

== D ==
- Dirk van Dalen (Netherlands, born 1932)
- Martin Davis (US, 1928–2023)
- Augustus De Morgan (UK, 1806–1871)
- René Descartes (France, 1596–1650)
- Dharmakirti (India, c. 7th century)
- Dignāga (India, fl. 5th century)
- Diodorus Cronus (Greece, 4th–3rd century BC)
- Martin Dorp (Netherlands, c. 1485–1525)
- John Dumbleton (England, died c. 1349)
- Michael A. E. Dummett (UK, 1925–2011)
- Jon Michael Dunn (US, 1941–2021)

== E ==
- Samuel Eilenberg (Poland, 1913–1998)
- Alexander Esenin-Volpin (Russia, 1924–2016)
- John Etchemendy (US, born 1952)
- Leonhard Euler (Switzerland, 1707–1783)

== F ==
- Solomon Feferman (US, 1928–2016)
- Richard Ferrybridge (England, 14th century)
- Hartry Field (US, born 1946)
- Kit Fine (US, born 1946)
- Melvin Fitting (US, born 1942)
- Graeme Forbes (Scotland, 20th century)
- Matthew Foreman (US, born 1957)
- Michael Fourman (UK, born 1950)
- Roland Fraïssé (France, 1920–2008)
- Abraham Fraenkel (Germany, 1891–1965)
- Gottlob Frege (Germany, 1848–1925)
- Harvey Friedman (US, born 1948)

== G ==
- Dov Gabbay (UK, born 1945)
- Haim Gaifman (US, born 1934)
- L. T. F. Gamut (collective pseudonym used by a group of Dutch logicians, fl. 1980s–1990s)
- Robin Gandy (UK, 1919–1995)
- Sol Garfunkel (US, born 1943)
- Garlandus Compotista (France, c. 11th century)
- Akṣapāda Gautama, author of Nyāya Sūtras and founder of Nyaya school of Hindu philosophy (India, c. 6th century BC to 2nd century AD)
- Gangesha Upadhyaya, author of Tattvacintāmaṇi (A Thought-Jewel of Truth) and founder of Navya-Nyāya (India, c. 14th century AD)
- Peter Geach (UK, 1916–2013)
- Gerhard Gentzen (Germany, 1909–1945)
- Joseph Diaz Gergonne (France, 1771–1859)
- Gilbert de la Porrée (France, 1070–1154)
- Giles of Rome (Italy, c. 1243–1316)
- Jean-Yves Girard (France, born 1947)
- Kurt Gödel (Austria, US, 1906–1978)
- Reuben Louis Goodstein (England, 1912–1985)
- Valentin Goranko (Bulgaria/Sweden, born 1959)
- Siegfried Gottwald (Germany, 1943–2015)
- Jeroen Groenendijk (Netherlands, 1949–2023)

== H ==
- Susan Haack (UK, born 1945)
- Petr Hájek (Czech Republic, 1941–2016)
- Leo Harrington (US, born 1946)
- Robert S. Hartman (Germany/US, 1910–1973)
- Georg Wilhelm Friedrich Hegel (Germany, 1770–1831)
- Jean Van Heijenoort (France/US, 1912–1986)
- Leon Henkin (US, 1921–2006)
- Jacques Herbrand (France, 1908–1931)
- Arend Heyting (Netherlands, 1898–1980)
- David Hilbert (Germany, 1862–1943)
- Jaakko Hintikka (Finland, 1929–2015)
- Alfred Horn (US, 1918–2001)
- William Alvin Howard (US, 1926–2026)
- Ehud Hrushovski (Israel, born 1959)
- Gérard Huet (France, born 1947)

== I ==
- Ibn Taymiyyah (Turkey, 1263–1328 AD)
- Marsilius of Inghen (Netherlands/France/Germany, 1330/1340–1396)

== J ==
- Giorgi Japaridze (Georgia, 20th century)
- Stanisław Jaśkowski (Poland, 1906–1965)
- Richard Jeffrey (US, 1926–2002)
- Ronald Jensen (US, Europe, 1936–2025)
- William Stanley Jevons (England, 1835–1882)
- John of St. Thomas/John Poinsot (Portugal/Spain, 1589–1644)
- William Ernest Johnson (UK, 1858–1931)
- Dick de Jongh (Netherlands, born 1939)
- Bjarni Jónsson (Iceland, 1920–2016)
- Philip Jourdain (UK, 1879–1919)
- Joachim Jungius (Germany, 1587–1657)
- Jñanasrimitra (India, 10th century)

== K ==
- David Kaplan (US, born 1933)
- Alexander S. Kechris (US, born 1946)
- Howard Jerome Keisler (US, born 1936)
- Ahmed Raza Khan (India, 1856–1921)
- Richard Kilvington (England, c. 1305–1361)
- Robert Kilwardby (England, c. 1215–1279)
- Stephen Cole Kleene (US, 1909–1994)
- Tadeusz Kotarbiński (Poland, 1886–1981)
- Robert Kowalski (US, UK, born 1941)
- Georg Kreisel (Austria/Britain/US, 1923–2015)
- Saul Kripke (US, 1940–2022)
- Leopold Kronecker (Germany, 1823–1891)
- Kenneth Kunen (US, 1943–2020)

== L ==
- Christine Ladd-Franklin (US, 1847–1930)
- Joachim Lambek (Canada, 1922–2014)
- Johann Heinrich Lambert (France/Germany, 1728–1777)
- Karel Lambert (US, born 1928)
- Gottfried Wilhelm Leibniz (Germany, 1646–1716)
- Stanisław Leśniewski (Poland, 1886–1939)
- Clarence Irving Lewis (US, 1883–1964)
- David Kellogg Lewis (US, 1941–2001)
- Adolf Lindenbaum (Poland, 1904–1941)
- Per Lindström (Sweden, 1936–2009)
- Ramon Llull (Spain, 1232–1315)
- Martin Löb (Germany, 1921–2006)
- Paul Lorenzen (Germany, 1915–1994)
- Jerzy Łoś (Poland, 1920–1998)
- Hermann Lotze (Germany, 1817–1881)
- Leopold Löwenheim (Germany, 1878–1957)
- Jan Łukasiewicz (Poland, 1878–1956)

== M ==
- Hugh MacColl (Scotland, 1837–1909)
- Saunders Mac Lane (US, 1909–2005)
- Dugald Macpherson (UK, 20th century)
- Penelope Maddy (US, born 1950)
- John Mair (Scotland, 1467–1550)
- David Makinson (Australia, UK, born 1941)
- María Manzano (Spain, born 1950)
- Gary R. Mar (US, born 1952)
- Ruth Barcan Marcus (US, 1921–2012)
- Donald A. Martin (US, born 1940)
- Richard Milton Martin (US, 1916–1985)
- Per Martin-Löf (Sweden, born 1942)
- Pavel Materna (Czech Republic, 1930–2024)
- Yuri Matiyasevich (Russia/Soviet Union, born 1947)
- C. A. Meredith (Ireland, 1904–1976)
- Bob Meyer (US, 1932–2009)
- John Stuart Mill (England, 1806–1873)
- Grigori Mints (Soviet Union/Estonia/US, 1939–2014)
- Richard Montague (US, 1930–1971)
- Yiannis N. Moschovakis (US, born 1938)
- Andrzej Mostowski (Poland, 1913–1975)

== N ==
- Sara Negri (Italy/Finland, born 1967)
- Edward Nelson (US, 1932–2014)
- John von Neumann (Hungary, US, 1903–1957)
- John Henry Newman (England, 1801–1890) (see Grammar of Assent)
- Jean Nicod (France, 1893–1924)
- Pyotr Novikov (Russia/Soviet Union, 1901–1975)
- Nagarjuna (India, c.150–c.250)
- Anil Nerode (US, born 1932)

== O ==
- William of Ockham (England, 1285–1349)
- Piergiorgio Odifreddi (Italy, born 1950)
- Ivan Orlov (Russia, 1886–1936)

== P ==
- John Pagus (France, fl. 1220–1229)
- Jeff Paris (UK, born 1944)
- Charles Parsons (US, 1933–2024)
- Solomon Passy (Bulgaria, born 1956)
- Paul of Venice (Italy, 1369–1429)
- Christine Paulin-Mohring (France, born 1962)
- Giuseppe Peano (Italy, 1858–1932)
- Dan Pedersen (US, born, 1945)
- Charles Sanders Peirce (US, 1839–1914)
- Lorenzo Peña (Spain, born 1944)
- Chaïm Perelman (Poland, Belgium, 1912–1984)
- Rózsa Péter (Hungary, 1905–1977)
- Paolo da Pergola (Italy, died 1455)
- Peter of Spain (13th century, usually assumed to be Pope John XXI)
- Philo the Dialectician (Greece, 4th–3rd century BC)
- Walter Pitts (US, 1923–1969)
- Porphyry (c. 234–c. 305)
- Henry Pogorzelski (US, 1922–2015)
- Emil Leon Post (US, 1897–1954)
- Dag Prawitz (Sweden, born 1936)
- Mojżesz Presburger (Poland, 1904–1943)
- Graham Priest (Australia, born 1948)
- Arthur Prior (New Zealand, UK, 1914–1969)
- Hilary Putnam (US, 1926–2016)
- Plato (Greek, 427–347 B.C.)

== Q ==
- Willard Van Orman Quine (US, 1908–2000)

== R ==
- Michael O. Rabin (Israel, US, 1931–2026)
- Constantin Rădulescu-Motru (Romania, 1868–1957)
- Frank Plumpton Ramsey (UK, 1903–1930)
- Petrus Ramus (France, 1515–1572)
- Helena Rasiowa (Poland, 1917–1994)
- Carveth Read (UK, 1848–1931)
- Abraham Robinson (Israel, UK, Canada, US, 1918–1974)
- Raphael M. Robinson (US, 1911–1995)
- Julia Robinson (US, 1919–1985)
- J. Barkley Rosser (US, 1907–1989)
- Richard Routley, later Richard Sylvan (New Zealand, 1935–1996)
- Frederick Rowbottom (UK, 1938–2009)
- Ian Rumfitt (UK, 20th century)
- Bertrand Russell (UK, 1872–1970)

== S ==
- Giovanni Girolamo Saccheri (Italy, 1667–1733)
- Raghunatha Siromani (India, c. 1477–1547)
- Gerald Sacks (US, 1933–2019)
- Albert of Saxony (Germany, c. 1316–1390)
- Rolf Schock (US, Sweden, 1933–1986)
- Moses Schönfinkel (USSR, 1889–1942)
- Ernst Schröder (Germany, 1841–1902)
- Kurt Schütte (Germany, 1909–1998)
- Dana Scott (US, born 1932)
- Sedulius Scottus (Ireland/France, fl. 840–860)
- John Duns Scotus (UK, France, c. 1266–1308)
- Stewart Shapiro (US, born 1951)
- Fyodor Shcherbatskoy (Russia, 1866–1942)
- Saharon Shelah (Israel, born 1945)
- Gila Sher (Israel/US)
- William of Sherwood (England, 1190–1249)
- Hui Shi (China, fl. 4th century BC)
- Simplicius of Cilicia (Turkey/Iran, c. 490–c. 560)
- Raghunatha Siromani (India, 1470s–1550s)
- Thoralf Skolem (Norway 1887–1963)
- Dimiter Skordev (Bulgaria, born 1936)
- Theodore Slaman (US, born 1954)
- Raymond Smullyan (US, 1919–2017)
- William of Soissons (France, 12th century)
- Robert M. Solovay (US, born 1938)
- Richard the Sophister (fl. late 13th century)
- Peter of Spain (13th century)
- John R. Steel (US, born 1948)
- Martin Stokhof (Netherlands, born 1950)
- Ralph Strode (England, fl. 1350–1400)
- Richard Swineshead (England, fl. c. 1340–1354)
- Richard Sylvan, born Richard Routley (New Zealand, 1935–1996)

== T ==
- Gaisi Takeuti (Japan, 1926–2017)
- Alfred Tarski (Poland, 1902–1983)
- Theophrastus (Greece, 371–c. 287 BC)
- Pavel Tichý (Czechoslovakia, New Zealand, 1936–1994)
- Friedrich Adolf Trendelenburg (Germany, 1802–1872)
- Anne Sjerp Troelstra (Netherlands, 1939–2019)
- Alan Turing (UK, 1912–1954)
- Kazimierz Twardowski (Poland, 1866–1938)
- Thales Of Miletus (Turkey, 626 BC – 545 BC)

== U ==
- Udayana, author of Nyayakusumanjali (rational theology to prove the existence of God using logic) (India, 10th century)
- Udyotakara (India, c. 6th century AD)
- Alasdair Urquhart (UK, born 1945)
- Vladimir Uspensky (Soviet Union/Russia, 1930–2018)

== V ==
- Lorenzo Valla (Italy, c. 1407–1457)
- Moshe Y. Vardi (Israel, born 1954)
- Nicolai A. Vasiliev (Russia, 1880–1940)
- Robert Lawson Vaught (US, 1926–2002)
- Paul of Venice (Italy, 1368–1428)
- John Venn (England, 1834–1923)
- Juan Luis Vives (Spain, 1493–1540)
- Pakṣilasvāmin Vātsyāyana wrote the first known commentary on Goutama's Nyaya Sutras (5th century AD)

== W ==
- Hao Wang (China/US, 1921–1995)
- Isaac Watts (England, 1674–1748)
- Richard Whately (England, 1787–1863)
- Alfred North Whitehead (UK, 1861–1947)
- Ludwig Wittgenstein (Austria, UK, 1889–1951)
- Christian Wolff (Germany, 1679–1754)
- W. Hugh Woodin (US, born 1955)
- John Woods (Canada, 1937–2024)
- Georg Henrik von Wright (Finland, UK, 1916–2003)

== Y ==
- Jin Yuelin (China, 1895–1984)

== Z ==
- Jacopo Zabarella (Italy, 1533–1589)
- Lotfi A. Zadeh (US, 1921–2017)
- Ernst Zermelo (Germany, 1871–1953)
- Alexander Zinoviev (Soviet Union, 1922–2006)
