= American Philosophical Quarterly =

- Discipline: Philosophy
- Language: English
- Edited by: Patrick Grim

Publication details
- History: 1964–present
- Publisher: University of Illinois Press on behalf of North American Philosophical Publications (United States)
- Frequency: Quarterly

Standard abbreviations
- ISO 4: Am. Philos. Q.

Indexing
- ISSN: 0003-0481 (print); 2152-1123 (web)
- LCCN: 00201400
- JSTOR: 00030481
- OCLC no.: 60623498

Links
- Journal homepage; Online access

The American Philosophical Quarterly (APQ) is a peer-reviewed academic journal covering philosophy. It was established in 1964 by Nicholas Rescher and is published quarterly by University of Illinois Press under license with North American Philosophical Publications.

== Abstracting and indexing ==
The journal is abstracted and indexed in:

- Academic Search
- Arts and Humanities Citation Index
- ATLA Religion Database
- Current Contents/Arts and Humanities
- International Bibliography of Periodical Literature
- Philosopher's Index
- Scopus

== Notable articles ==
- "Causes and Conditions" (1965) - J. L. Mackie
- "Indicators and Quasi-indicators" (1967) - Hector-Neri Castañeda
- "Truth in fiction" (1978) - David Lewis
- "Supervenience and Nomological Incommensurables" (1978) - Jaegwon Kim
- "The Corporation as a Moral Person" (1979) - Peter A French
- "On Reasoning about Values" (1980) - Wilfred Sellars
- "From Exasperating Virtues to Civic Virtues" (1996) - Amélie Oksenberg Rorty
- "The Enforcement of Morality" (2000) - John Kekes

== See also ==
- List of philosophy journals
