= Ivan Orlov =

Ivan Orlov may refer to:

- Ivan Grigoryevich Orlov (1733–1791), brother of Grigory Grigoryevich Orlov
- Ivan Orlov (aviator) (1895–1917), Russian World War I flying ace
- Ivan Orlov (philosopher) (1886–1936), Russian philosopher and industrial chemist
