= Gary R. Mar =

American Philosopher

Gary R. Mar is an American philosopher and logician specializing in logic, the philosophy of logic, the philosophy of mathematics, analytic philosophy, philosophy of language and linguistics, philosophy of science, computational philosophy, the philosophy of religion, and Asian American philosophy. Professor Mar is a member of the Philosophy Department at Stony Brook University. Gary Mar was the last student to have a Ph.D. directed by Alonzo Church. He is co-author with Donald Kalish and Richard Montague of the second edition of Logic: Techniques of Formal Reasoning.

He is also co-author of The Philosophical Computer with Patrick Grim and Paul St. Denis, which uses computer modelling to explore fractal images and chaos in semantic paradoxes. This research was featured in a column by Ian Stewart ('A Partly True Story,' in Scientific American (Feb. 1993, 110–112). This research was also presented at the Kurt Gödel Centenary Symposium, Horizons of Truth at the University of Vienna in April 2006.

Gary Mar is the founding director of the Stony Brook Philosophy Department Logic Lab at Stony Brook and the founding director of the Asian American Center at Stony Brook, after being the catalyst for the donation of the Charles B. Wang Asian American Center at Stony Brook University, which at that time was the largest donation in the history of the public education system in New York State.

In 2003 he hosted a graduate seminar with Noam Chomsky through the President's Rotating Stars Program, and in 2005 he was instrumental in the awarding of an honorary doctorate to documentary filmmaker Loni Ding, whose landmark series Ancestors in the Americas is an in-depth documentary on the history of Asians in the Americas.

Gary Mar has been the recipient of the Chancellor's and President's Award for Excellence in Teaching (1993), the Chancellor's Award for Excellence in University Service (2015), the Alumni Association Outstanding Professor Award (1995), a Pew Foundation Research Fellowship (1995–1996), and was a charter member Stony Brook's Academy of Scholar-Teachers (1996). As a graduate student, Gary Mar was a co-winner of the Rudolf Carnap Dissertation prize (UCLA, 1985).

== Publications ==
Books

- Forthcoming: Gödel’s Ontological Dreams: Excursions in Logic (World Scientific).
- Forthcoming: Alice's Logical Adventures in Wonderland: Thinking Matters as Logical and MAGICAL Thinking (World Scientific).
- Forthcoming: Paradoxes, The Game of Life and The Logic of Time (World Scientific).
- Thinking Matters I: Critical Thinking as Creative Problem Solving. World Scientific, 2021.
- Logic: Techniques of Formal Reasoning(second edition), co-authored with Donald Kalish and Richard Montague, HBJ, 1980. Republished by Oxford University Press, 2000.
- The Philosophical Computer: Exploratory Essays in Philosophical Computer Modeling co-authored with Patrick Grim and Paul St. Denis, M.I.T. Press, 1998.

Selected articles include

- "Philosophical Insights from Computational Studies: Why Should Computational Studies Matter to Philosophers?" With Edward Zalta and Aydin Mohseni. APA Newsletter on Philosophy and Computers, vol. 19, no. 1, 32-39, Fall 2019.
- "Gödel's Ontological Dreams." Space, Time and the Limits of Human Understanding, S. Wuppuluri and G. Ghirardi (eds.), Springer, 461–76, 2017.
- "Unless and Until: A Compositional Analysis." with Amanda Caffary and Yuliya Manyakina, in Logic, Language and Computation, Tenth International Tbilisi Symposium on Logic, Language, and Computation. Revised Selected Papers, Martin Aher, Daniel Hole, Emil Jerábek, Clemens Kupke (eds.), Lecture Notes in Computer Science 8994, Springer-Verlag, Berlin, 190–209, 2015.
- "Chaotic, Fuzzy, and Imaginary Liars: Degrees of Truth, Truth Vectors, and the Fractal Geometry of Paradox." Vienna Summer of Logic, Logic Colloquium: Logic Algebra and Truth Degrees Abstracts, 213-217, 2014.
- "Church's Theorem and Randomness." Logic, Meaning and Computation: Essays In Memory of Alonzo Church, C. Anthony Anderson and Mikhail Zeleny (eds.), Kluwer Academic Publishers: Netherlands, 479–90, 2001.
- "Evolutionary Game Theory, Morality and Darwinism." In, 'Commentary Discussion of Brian Skyrm's Paper.' Journal of Consciousness Studies: Evolutionary Origins of Morality, vol. 7, no. 1/2, 2000.
- "What the Liar Taught Achilles." The Journal of Philosophical Logic, vol. 28, 29–46, 1999.
- "Real Life." International Journal of Bifurcation and Chaos, vol. 6, no. 11, 2077–2086, 1996.
- "The Modal Unity of Anselm's Proslogion." Faith and Philosophy, vol. 13, no. 1, 50–67, 1996.
- "Chaos in Cooperation: Continuous-Valued Prisoner's Dilemmas in Infinite-Valued Logic." International Journal of Bifurcation and Chaos, no. 4, 943–958, 1994.
- "Why ‘Cantorian’ Arguments Against the Existence of God Do Not Work." International Philosophical Quarterly, vol. XXXIII, 429–442, Dec. 1993.
- "Pattern and Chaos: New Images in the Semantics of Paradox." Noûs. vol. XXV, 659–693, Dec. 1991.
- "What Euthyphro Couldn't Have Said." Faith and Philosophy no. 4, 241–261, July 1987.

Selected articles in Asian and Asian American Philosophy

- "Chinese Virtues, Four Prisons, and the Way On." Journal of Chinese Philosophy, Special Issue: Walls and Co-Existence, vol. 46, nos. 1–2, 97–118, 2019.
- "Hao Wang's Logical Journey." Journal of Chinese Philosophy, Thematic Issue: Time, Space, and Mind: Roots of Humanity, vol. 42, 540-61, 2015.
- "Approaching the Tenth Anniversary of 9/11 Through Asian American Eyes." Editor. American Philosophical Association Newsletter, Committee on the Status of Asian and Asian-American Philosophers and Philosophies, vol. 10, no. 2, Spring 2011. (With articles by George Lipsitz, “Affinities, Affiliations, and Alliances: Why Asian American Perspectives Matter Now”; Mary Watkins, “The Shame of Forcibly Displacing Others: 9/11 and the Criminalization of Immigration”; and Gary Okihiro, “The Alien: Reflections on the Border Ten Years After 9/11").
- "Angel Island Reflections." American Philosophical Association Newsletter, Committee on the Status of Asian and Asian-American Philosophers and Philosophies, vol. 10, no. 1, Fall 2010.
- "New Media and New Pedagogy in Asian American Studies: Strategies for Transforming Knowledge into a Pedagogy of Empowerment." American Philosophical Association Newsletter, Committee on the Status of Asian and Asian American Philosophers and Philosophies, vol. 3, no. 1, 19–32, Fall 2003.
- "What Does Asian American Studies Have to Do With Philosophy?" American Philosophical Association Newsletter, Committee on the Status of Asian and Asian-American Philosophers and Philosophies, vol. 2, no. 2, 27–30, Spring 2003.

== Education ==
UCLA Ph.D. 1985

U.C. Davis B.A. Philosophy, B.S. Mathematics 1974
