= Jon Michael Dunn =

American philosopher (1941–2021)

- Born: June 19, 1941; Fort Wayne, Indiana, U.S.
- Died: April 5, 2021 (aged 79); Bloomington, Indiana, U.S.
- Education: Oberlin College; University of Pittsburgh
- Spouse: Sarah Jane Dunn (m. 1964)
- Children: 2
- Scientific career
- Fields: Logic, philosophy, computer science
- Workplaces: Wayne State University; Indiana University Bloomington
- Doctoral advisor: Nuel Belnap
- Doctoral students: Katalin Bimbó

Jon Michael Dunn (June 19, 1941 – April 5, 2021) was an American logician. He was the Oscar Ewing Professor Emeritus of Philosophy, professor emeritus of Informatics and Computer Science, a founding member of the cognitive science program, was twice chair of the Philosophy Department, was Executive Associate Dean of the College of Arts and Sciences, and was founding dean of the School of Informatics (now the Luddy School of Informatics, Computing, and Engineering) at Indiana University.

== Early life and education ==
Dunn was born in Fort Wayne, Indiana. He went to high school in Lafayette, Indiana, where he worked in Purdue Biology laboratories after school and summers. He was the first in his family to go to college.

He obtained an A.B. in Philosophy from Oberlin College and a Ph.D. in philosophy (Logic) from the University of Pittsburgh, where he wrote his dissertation, The Algebra of Intensional Logics.

== Career ==
He taught at Wayne State University and at Yale University before coming to Indiana University Bloomington in 1969, from which he retired in 2007.

He received grants from the NSF, NEH, ACLS, and was a visiting scholar at, among other places, the Australian National University, University of Oxford, and the University of Melbourne. In 2014, he was a visiting professor at his Ph.D. alma mater the University of Pittsburgh. In 2002, he accepted on behalf of the School of Informatics the Techpoint (Indiana Information Technology association) Mira for Outstanding Education Contribution to Information Technology. In 2007, he was awarded the Indiana University Bloomington Provost's Medal and was made a Sagamore of the Wabash by the Governor of Indiana.

He was a Fellow of the American Academy of Arts and Sciences. He served as President of the Society for Exact Philosophy and on the executive committee of the Association for Symbolic Logic. He was also an editor of the Journal of Symbolic Logic and chief editor of the Journal of Philosophical Logic. He published six books and over 100 papers, and directed or co-directed 17 Ph.D. dissertations (Philosophy, Cognitive Science, Computer Science, Mathematics).

After he retired, he served on the board of HealthLINC for ten years, the regional health information exchange, and was president there for three years. From 2010, he was affiliated with the Info-Metrics Institute, American University, and was a member of its advisory board (co-chair 2017–21).

== Work ==
Dunn's research focuses on information-based logics, particularly relevance logics and other so-called "substructural" logics. He has an algebraic approach to these under the heading of "gaggle theory" (for generalized Galois logics), which he has developed in articles, his book with G. Hardgree Algebraic Methods in Philosophical Logic (Oxford, 2001), and a book with Katalin Bimbó, Generalized Galois Logics: Relational Semantics of Nonclassical Logical Calculi (CSLI Publications, 2008).

He studied as a graduate student with the two major figures in relevance logic, Alan Ross Anderson and Nuel Belnap. He was a contributing author to their book Entailment: The Logic of Relevance and Entailment Vol. 1, and a full co-author with them to Vol. 2.

He also worked on quantum logic, quantum computation, subjective probability in the context of incomplete and conflicting information, and with Katalin Bimbό proved the decidability of Ticket Entailment (a problem open since 1960). Dunn was honored in 2016 by the book J. Michael Dunn on Information Based Logic, edited by Katalin Bimbó, part of the Springer series Outstanding Contributions to Logic.
