= Ruth Manor =

Israeli philosopher

Ruth (Ruru) Manor (Hebrew: רות מנור; née Wolman, 1944–2005) was an Israeli philosopher and logician.

== Life ==
Manor was born in 1944 in Addis Ababa, where her father, Moshe Wolman, was the physician to Haile Selassie. After the family returned to Israel, she grew up in Jerusalem, and moved as a teenager to Tel Aviv. She did her undergraduate studies in mathematics and philosophy at the Hebrew University of Jerusalem. Next, she studied for a master's degree at the University of Pittsburgh with logician Nicholas Rescher; their joint work, published in 1970,^{[RM]} produced the Rescher–Manor mechanism for deriving consequences from consistent subsets of inconsistent assumptions. Continuing at the University of Pittsburgh, she completed a Ph.D. in 1971, with the dissertation Conditional forms: assertion, necessity, obligation and commands supervised by Nuel Belnap.

Manor taught in the Department of Philosophy and Religion at Virginia Tech in 1973 and 1974. She returned to Israel, but was unsuccessful at obtaining an academic position there. Instead, she joined the philosophy department at San Jose State University in California, where she was tenured in 1986, promoted to full professor in 1988, and eventually became head of the department. In 1993, she took a position at Tel Aviv University, while continuing to hold her affiliation at San Jose State University, from which she retired in 2004.

Late in her life she published a book on the philosophy of health care with her father.^{[WM]} She died in 2005.

== Recognition ==
After a conference in her memory at Tel Aviv University, a festschrift was published, entitled Hues of Philosophy.

== Selected publications ==
RM.	Rescher, Nicholas; Manor, Ruth (December 1970), "On inference from inconsistent premisses", Theory and Decision, 1 (2): 179–217, doi:10.1007/bf00154005

WM.	Wolman, Moshe; Manor, Ruth (2004), Doctors' Errors and Mistakes of Medicine: Must Health Care Deteriorate?, Biomedical and health research, vol. 59, IOS Press, ISBN 978-1-58603-403-0
