= C. Anthony Anderson =

Contemporary American philosopher

Curtis Anthony Anderson (born May 29, 1940) is an American philosopher, currently Professor of Philosophy at the University of California, Santa Barbara.

He earned his Ph.D. in philosophy from University of California, Los Angeles in 1977, where he worked closely with the renowned logician Alonzo Church. He also holds an M.S. in mathematics from the University of Houston (1965), where he earned his undergraduate degree in physics and mathematics (1964).

Anderson's work over the years has focused primarily in the philosophy of logic and the philosophy of language, although he also works in such areas as the philosophy of religion and has an interest in most areas of traditional philosophy.

Prior to his professorship at U.C. Santa Barbara, Anderson held posts notably at the University of Minnesota, and the University of Texas at Austin.

== Publications ==
- The Paradox of the Knower, 1983.
- Divine Omnipotence and Impossible Tasks: An Intensional Analysis, 1984.
- Some Difficulties Concerning Russellian Intensional Logic, 1986.
- Bealer's Quality and Concept, 1987.
- Propositional Attitudes: The Role of Content in Logic, Language, and Mind, 1990.
- Analyzing Analysis, 1993.

== See also ==
- American philosophy
- List of American philosophers
