= Moshe Wolman =

Israeli neuropathologist

- משה וולמן
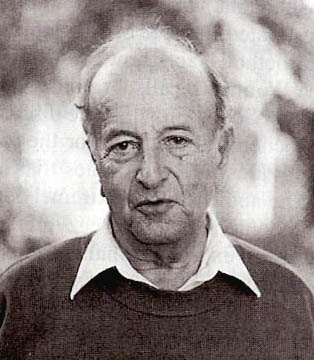
- Wolman, 1999
- Born: October 19, 1914; Warsaw, Poland
- Died: September 5, 2009 (aged 94); Israel
- Spouse: Brigitte "Bigi" Koebbel
- Children: 4 (Dan Wolman, Ruth Manor, Naomi Oren & Amnon Wolman)

Moshe Wolman (Hebrew: משה וולמן; October 19, 1914 – September 5, 2009) was an Israeli neuropathologist. He is considered one of the pioneers of histochemistry. In 1954, he described Wolman's disease.

== Biography ==
Moshe Wolman was born in 1914 in Warsaw, Poland. He immigrated to Mandate Palestine in 1925. He studied medicine in Italy, receiving his medical degree from the University of Rome in 1938.

== Medical career ==
After finishing his medical degree, he returned to Jerusalem and worked at Hadassah Hospital. In the 1940s, he volunteered to serve in the British Army and joined the 101 Military Mission (the famous Gideon Force of Orde Wingate). He was involved in the operation in 1941 that brought Emperor Haile Selassie back to occupied Ethiopia.

He taught pathology at the Hebrew University. Wolman researched the chemical significance of the periodic acid-Schiff (PAS) staining method and showed that the method is not specific for carbohydrates as was thought at the time, but also stains lipids.

In the 1950s, his research included histochemistry of viral and non-viral inclusion bodies.

In 1959, Wolman was appointed head of the Department of Pathology of the Tel Hashomer Government Hospital (later renamed as the Chaim Sheba Medical Center).

In 1964, Wolman was appointed full professor and head of the Department of Pathology at the newly founded Medical School of Tel Aviv University.

He was deeply interested in educational and ethical questions. He published a book on ethics and demagoguery and served as chairperson of the ethics committee of the Israel Medical Association. He was concerned with the issues of medical errors and published a book on the subject together with his daughter, Ruth Manor, "Doctor's Errors and Mistakes of Medicine: Must Health Care Deteriorate?" (2004).

== Awards and legacy ==
In 1966, he was elected as a member of the Deutsche Akademie der Naturforscher Leopoldina.

Wolman was the first recipient of the Pearse Prize for Histochemistry awarded by the Royal Microscopical Society in 1989. He was appointed emeritus professor of the Tel Aviv University.

== Published works ==
=== Editor ===
- The Healing and Scarring of Atheroma. Advances in Experimental Medicine and Biology, New York, 1984, volume 168.
- Pigments in Pathology, Academic Press, New York, NY. 1969

=== Author ===
- A histochemical method for the differential staining of acidic tissue components (particularly ground-substance polysaccharides), Bull Res Council Israel. 1956
- Histochemistry and lipids in pathology. Handbuch of Histochemie. Fischer, Stuttgart, Germany. 1964
- On the Use of polarized microscopy in pathology, Pathol Annu. 1970
- Amyloid, its nature and molecular structure, Lab Invest. 1971
- Biological peroxidation of lipids and membranes, Israel J Med Sci. 1975
- An experiment in teaching histology and cell biology, Med Teacher. 1985
- Macrophages and their acid esterase in atherosclerosis. Pearse Prize Lecture Speech delivered 5 January 1988) Pro Roy Microsc Soc. 1989
- Lipid pigments, Fischer, Stuttgart, Germany. 1993
- Doctors' Errors and Mistakes of Medicine: Must Health Care Deteriorate? (Biomedical and Health Research, Volume 59) by Moshe Wolman and Ruth Manor (Hardcover - Jun 1, 2004)
- The Healing and Scarring of Atheroma (Advances in Experimental Medicine and Biology) by Moshe Wolman (Hardcover - Feb 1984)
- Pigments in Pathology by Moshe Wolman (Hardcover - Jan 1, 1969)
- Histochemistry of lipids in pathology (Handbuch der Histochemie) by Moshe Wolman (Unknown Binding - 1964)
- Biological peroxidation of lipids and membranes (Israel journal of medical sciences) by Moshe Wolman (Unknown Binding - 1975)

== See also ==
- Health care in Israel
