= Frege–Church ontology =

The Frege–Church ontology is an ontology, a theory of existence. Everything is considered as being in three categories, object (referent, denotation), name, or concept (sense). The ontology was developed by Alonzo Church based on ideas of Gottlob Frege to resolve some paradoxes. The ontology is related to certain modal logics.

== Paradox of the name relationship ==
- Suppose we are in the year 1995. Suppose Mary believes that Pluto (at the time still considered a planet) is the farthest planet from the sun. Because of Pluto’s irregular orbit, the orbit of Pluto crossed the orbit of Neptune, so that in 1995, the farthest planet from the sun is Neptune. Suppose Mary does not know this fact.

If x = y and y = z, then substituting z for y, x = z.
(1) Mary believes that Pluto = the farthest planet from the sun.
(2) Neptune = the farthest planet from the sun.
Therefore, substituting ‘Neptune’ for ‘the farthest planet from the sun’ in (1), we get
(3) Mary believes that Pluto = Neptune.

However, Mary does not believe that Pluto is Neptune, a paradox.

The Frege–Church ontology resolves this by saying the belief introduces an "intensional context" whereby the terms following the words "believes that" are in a context whereby they refer not to the denotation of the words, but to the concept associated with the words for the believer. Each word has a name, a denotation, and a concept associated with it.

== Terminology ==
=== Propositions, properties, and relationships ===
- An object has properties. A banana has the property of being yellow.
- A proposition is a sentence that is either true or false. A proposition can be considered to be a function, with objects in it considered as variables, and the value of the function being either truth or falsity, a truth function. For example, write “x is yellow” as Y(x), so that Y(x) = Truth, if and only if “x is yellow” is true, and Y(x) = Falsity if and only if “x is Yellow” is false. For example, Y(banana) = Truth, since a banana is yellow. However, Y(apple) = Truth also, since some apples are yellow.
- Similarly a sentence expressing a relationship between two objects can be considered a truth function of two variables, that is, a relationship between two objects can be considered to be a truth function of two variables. For example, let S(x, y) = “x is smaller than y”. So S(mouse, elephant) = Truth, since a mouse is smaller than an elephant, but S(mouse, ant) = Falsity, since a mouse is not smaller than an ant.

=== Object, name, concept ===
- An object (referent, denotation) has a name, the name of the object. The object has a concept (sense), the concept of the object, associated with the name of the object. A name or concept are themselves objects, and have names, the name of the name of the object, and the name of the concept of the object. Similarly they have concepts as any other object. A name is said to denote the object for which it is the name.

== Resolution of the paradox of the name relationship using the Frege–Church ontology ==
=== Ambiguities in ordinary language lead to confusion ===
- The English ordinary language has ambiguities that need to be clarified as we sometimes refer to an object with a word, e.g., a cat. We refer to the name by using scare quotes, the name of the cat, e.g., the word “cat”. There is ambiguity in the language as regards referring to the cat as a concept, and cat as an object.

=== Intensional context ===
- An expression such as “believes that” is said to introduce an intensional context. In an intensional context, the names that occur denote the concepts of the objects for the believer. They do not denote the objects themselves.

=== Resolution ===
“The farthest planet from the sun”, as it appears in proposition (1) is Mary’s concept of “the farthest planet from the sun”, not about the actual farthest planet from the sun as it appears in (2), so the substitution cannot be done. A more rigorous and formal treatment of this is given by Church.
