= William Boone (mathematician) =

American mathematician (1920–1983)

William Werner Boone
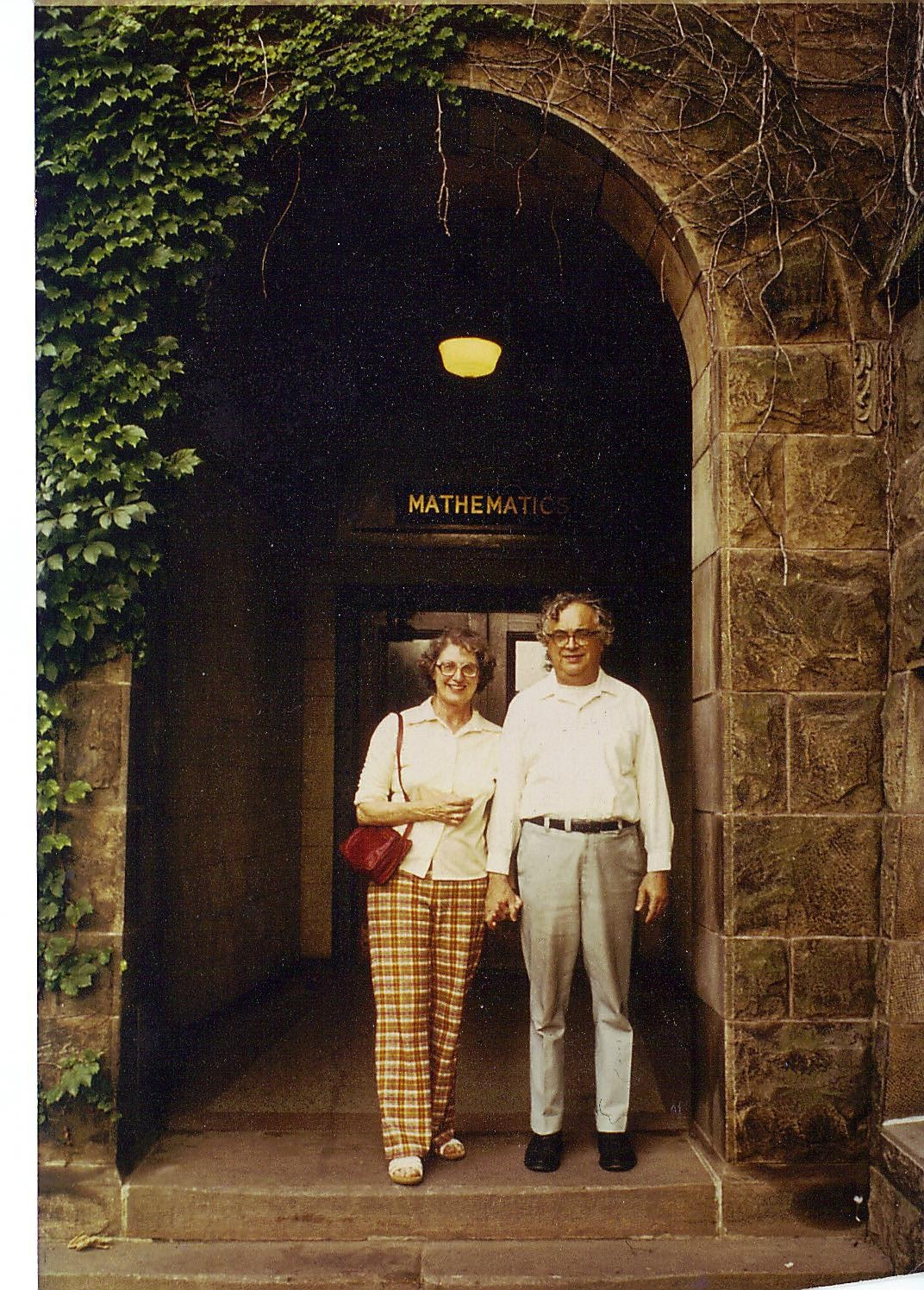
- William W. Boone and Eileen Boone at Altgeld Hall, University of Illinois, 1979
- Born: January 16, 1920; Cincinnati, Ohio
- Died: September 14, 1983 (aged 63); Urbana, Illinois
- Education: Princeton University
- Known for: Boone–Higman theorem Boone–Rogers theorem Novikov–Boone theorem
- Scientific career
- Fields: Mathematics
- Workplaces: University of Illinois at Urbana–Champaign; Institute for Advanced Study
- Doctoral advisor: Alonzo Church

William Werner Boone (16 January 1920 in Cincinnati – 14 September 1983 in Urbana, Illinois) was an American mathematician. He completed his undergrad degree as a part time student at the University of Cincinnati.

Alonzo Church was his Ph.D. advisor at Princeton, and Kurt Gödel was his friend at the Institute for Advanced Study.

Pyotr Novikov showed in 1955 that there exists a finitely presented group G such that the word problem for G is undecidable. A different proof was obtained by Boone in a paper published in 1958.

== Selected publications ==
- W. W. Boone, Decision problems about algebraic and logical systems as a whole and recursively enumerable degrees of unsolvability. 1968 Contributions to Math. Logic (Colloquium, Hannover, 1966), North-Holland, Amsterdam.
- W. W. Boone, Roger Lyndon, Frank Cannonito, Word Problems: Decision Problem in Group Theory, North-Holland, 1973.
