= Philosopher's Annual =

The Philosopher's Annual
- Discipline: Philosophy
- Language: English
- Edited by: Patrick Grim, Boris Babic, Caroline Perry and Joseph Shin

Publication details
- History: 1978–present
- Frequency: annual

Standard abbreviations
- ISO 4: Philos.'s Annu.

Indexing
- ISSN: 0162-234X

Links
- Journal homepage

The Philosopher's Annual (PA) is an annual selection of ten best papers in philosophy. It takes as its goal "to select the ten best articles published in philosophy each year—an attempt as simple to state as it is admittedly impossible to fulfill". It is published annually since 1978. The editor is Patrick Grim, and he is joined each year by Ph.D. students in philosophy from the University of Michigan in making the final selections.
