= Donald Kalish =

American logician and political activist (1919–2000)

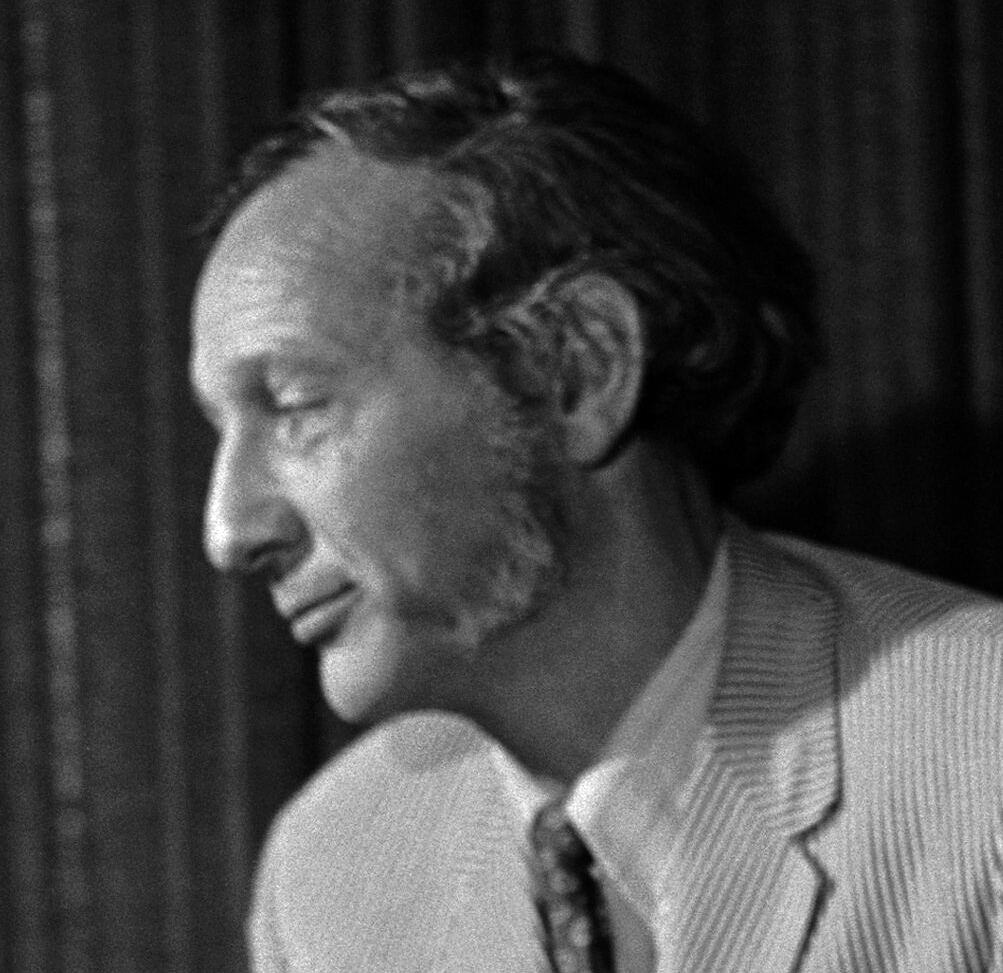
- Born: December 4, 1919; Chicago, Illinois, U.S.
- Died: June 8, 2000 (aged 80); Los Angeles, California

Education
- Education: University of California, Berkeley (1940–1948)

Philosophical work
- Institutions: University of California, Los Angeles (1949–1990)
- Main interests: Logic, semantics

Donald Kalish (December 4, 1919 – June 8, 2000) was an American logician, educator, and anti-war activist.

== Biography ==
Born in Chicago, Illinois, Kalish earned his bachelor's and master's degrees in psychology and his doctorate in philosophy at the University of California, Berkeley. After teaching at Swarthmore College and at UC Berkeley, he joined the faculty of the University of California, Los Angeles in 1949.

Kalish was perhaps best known for his outspoken opposition to the war in Vietnam and later, his opposition to U.S. military involvement in Nicaragua and Grenada. As chairman of the philosophy department of UCLA, Kalish hired Marxist political activist Angela Davis, an act that drew considerable controversy at the time. In 2001, the university's Philosophy Department initiated the Donald Kalish Prize for intellectual excellence, given to the most promising undergraduate student in the department.

Kalish was a founder of the Concerned Faculty of UCLA. He served as a member of the University Committee on Vietnam, and as vice-chairman of Peace Action Council, Los Angeles. He is known for his leadership role with the Peace Action Council in a 1967 protest against President Lyndon Johnson's Vietnam policies at the Century Plaza Hotel in Los Angeles, which brought out 10,000 people. He was also an organizer of the 1967 March on the Pentagon to protest the Vietnam War and his activities were prominently chronicled in Norman Mailer's The Armies of the Night (1968).

In 1967, Kalish signed a letter declaring his intention to refuse to pay 25% of his taxes in protest against the U.S. war against Vietnam, and urging other people to also take this stand.

Kalish was an expert on logic, set theory and the history of both subjects. With Richard Montague, he developed an innovative and elegant method of doing formal logical proofs by natural deduction.

== Method of logical proof ==
When a proof is done by the Kalish and Montague method, the lines have an indented structure of "proofs within proofs." The first line of the outermost proof always starts with the word "Show" followed by the statement to be proven. Additional "Show" lines can appear anywhere within the proof, thereby commencing sub-proofs. Immediately after a "Show" line, the subsequent lines are indented one level. When a proof at any level is completed, a box is drawn around the lines in that indentation, making them inaccessible thereafter, and the word "Show" is canceled, whereupon the statement after the canceled "Show" becomes an active line, accessible at the next level out. A proof is finished when all the lines except the first line are enclosed in one or more boxes, and the word "Show" on the first line is canceled. The method is extremely elegant and greatly aides the understanding and teaching of logic.

The proof system is set forth in detail in Logic: Techniques of Formal Reasoning by Richard Montague and Donald Kalish, which was published in 1964. Montague died in 1971. Kalish published a second edition of the book in 1980 with Gary Mar. Since the late 1960s, these books have been used as a textbook at many universities, including UCLA.

== Publications ==
- Logic: Techniques of Formal Reasoning by Donald Kalish and Richard Montague, 1964
- Logic: Techniques of Formal Reasoning by Donald Kalish, Richard Montague and Gary Mar, 1980
