= Alonzo Church =

American mathematician and computer scientist (1903–1995)

- Born: June 14, 1903; Washington, D.C., U.S.
- Died: August 11, 1995 (aged 92); Hudson, Ohio, U.S.
- Education: Princeton University (BS, PhD)
- Known for: Lambda calculus Simply typed lambda calculus Church encoding Church's theorem Church–Kleene ordinal Church–Turing thesis Frege–Church ontology Church–Rosser theorem Intensional logic
- Scientific career
- Fields: Computer science, Mathematics, Logic
- Workplaces: Princeton University (1929–67); UCLA (1967–95)
- Thesis: Alternatives to Zermelo's Assumption (1927)
- Doctoral advisor: Oswald Veblen
- Doctoral students: See list: C. Anthony Anderson; Peter Andrews; George Alfred Barnard; William W. Boone; Martin Davis; William Easton; Alfred Foster; Leon Henkin; John George Kemeny; Stephen Cole Kleene; Simon B. Kochen; Maurice L'Abbé; Gary R. Mar; Michael O. Rabin; Nicholas Rescher; Hartley Rogers, Jr; J. Barkley Rosser; Dana Scott; Norman Shapiro; Raymond Smullyan; Alan Turing

Alonzo Church (June 14, 1903 – August 11, 1995) was an American computer scientist, mathematician, logician, and philosopher who made major contributions to mathematical logic and the foundations of theoretical computer science. He is best known for the lambda calculus, the Church–Turing thesis, proving the unsolvability of the Entscheidungsproblem ("decision problem"), the Frege–Church ontology, and the Church–Rosser theorem. Alongside his doctoral student Alan Turing, Church is considered one of the founders of computer science.

== Career ==
Alonzo Church was born on June 14, 1903, in Washington, D.C., where his father, Samuel Robbins Church, was a justice of the peace and the judge of the Municipal Court for the District of Columbia. He was the grandson of Alonzo Webster Church (1829-1909), United States Senate Librarian from 1881 to 1901, and great-grandson of Alonzo Church, a professor of Mathematics and Astronomy and 6th President of the University of Georgia. As a young boy, Church was partially blinded by an air gun accident. The family later moved to Virginia after his father lost his position at the university because of failing eyesight. With help from his uncle, also named Alonzo Church, the son attended the private Ridgefield School for Boys in Ridgefield, Connecticut. After graduating from Ridgefield in 1920, Church attended Princeton University, where he was an exceptional student. He published his first paper on Lorentz transformations in 1924 and graduated the same year with a degree in mathematics. He stayed at Princeton for graduate work, earning a Ph.D. in mathematics in three years under Oswald Veblen.

He married Mary Julia Kuczinski in 1925. The couple had three children: Alonzo Jr. (1929), Mary Ann (1933), and Mildred (1938).

After receiving his Ph.D., he taught briefly as an instructor at the University of Chicago. He received a two-year National Research Fellowship that enabled him to attend Harvard University in 1927–1928, and the University of Göttingen and University of Amsterdam the following year.

He taught philosophy and mathematics at Princeton for nearly four decades, from 1929 to 1967. He held the Flint Professorship of Philosophy and Mathematics at the University of California, Los Angeles, 1967–1990. He was a Plenary Speaker at the ICM in 1962 in Stockholm.

He received honorary Doctor of Science degrees from Case Western Reserve University in 1969, Princeton University in 1985, and the University at Buffalo, The State University of New York in 1990 in connection with an international symposium in his honor organized by John Corcoran.

He was elected a Corresponding Fellow of the British Academy (FBA) in 1966, to the American Academy of the Arts and Sciences in 1967, to the National Academy of Sciences in 1978.

Church was a lifelong member of the Presbyterian church. He died on August 11, 1995, at the age of 92. He is buried in Princeton Cemetery.

== Mathematical work ==
Church is known for the following accomplishments:

- His proof that the Entscheidungsproblem, which asks for a decision procedure to determine the truth of arbitrary propositions in a first-order mathematical theory, is undecidable. This is known as Church's theorem.
- His invention of the lambda calculus.
- His use of the lambda calculus to prove that Peano arithmetic is undecidable.
- His articulation of what has come to be known as the Church–Turing thesis.
- Being a founding editor of the Journal of Symbolic Logic, editing its reviews section for 43 years from 1936 until 1979.
- His authorship of a prominent textbook in the field of mathematical logic, Introduction to Mathematical Logic.
- The Church–Rosser theorem

The lambda calculus emerged in his 1936 paper showing the unsolvability of the Entscheidungsproblem. This result preceded Alan Turing's work on the halting problem, which also demonstrated the existence of a problem unsolvable by mechanical means. Upon hearing of Church's work, Turing enrolled at Princeton later that year under Church for a Ph.D. Church and Turing then showed that the lambda calculus and the Turing machine used in Turing's halting problem were equivalent in capabilities, and subsequently demonstrated a variety of alternative "mechanical processes for computation." This resulted in the Church–Turing thesis.

The efforts for automatically generating a controller implementation from specifications originates from his ideas.

The lambda calculus influenced the design of Lisp and functional programming languages in general. The Church encoding is named in his honor.

In his honor the Alonzo Church Award for Outstanding Contributions to Logic and Computation was established in 2015 by the Association for Computing Machinery Special Interest Group for Logic and Computation (ACM SIGLOG), the European Association for Theoretical Computer Science (EATCS), the European Association for Computer Science Logic (EACSL), and the Kurt Gödel Society (KGS). The award is for an outstanding contribution to the field published within the past 25 years and must not yet have received recognition via another major award, such as the Turing Award, the Paris Kanellakis Award, or the Gödel Prize.

Church also made contributions to the theory of random sequences.

== Philosophical work ==
Church's elaboration of a methodology involving the logistic method, his philosophical criticisms of nominalism and his defense of realism, his argumentation leading to conclusions about the theory of meaning, and the detailed construction of the Fregean and Russellian intensional logics, are more than sufficient to place him high up among the most important philosophers of this century.

— C. Anthony Anderson, doctoral student of Church (1977)

Church is also known for the Frege-Church ontology, which he created based on the philosophical ideas of Gottlob Frege. He is credited with formulating the Slingshot Argument, which suggests that sentential references must be truth-values, rather than propositions.

== Influence ==
Over the course of his academic career, Church oversaw 31 doctoral students. Many of them have led distinguished careers in mathematics, computer science, and other academic subjects, including Peter B. Andrews, George A. Barnard, David Berlinski, William W. Boone, Martin Davis, Alfred L. Foster, Leon Henkin, John G. Kemeny, Stephen C. Kleene, Simon B. Kochen, Maurice L'Abbé, Gary R. Mar, Michael O. Rabin, Nicholas Rescher, Hartley Rogers, Jr., J. Barkley Rosser, Dana Scott, Raymond Smullyan and Alan Turing.

In addition to those he directly supervised, Church also had a large influence on other mathematicians and computer scientists. Haskell Curry, who expanded on Church's ideas with the concept of currying, stated that one of his textbooks, Introduction to Mathematical Logic (first published in 1944), was "written with the meticulous precision which characterizes the author's work generally."

== Bibliography ==
=== Books ===
- Alonzo Church, Introduction to Mathematical Logic (1944) (ISBN 978-0-691-02906-1)
- Alonzo Church, The Calculi of Lambda-Conversion (1941) (ISBN 978-0-691-08394-0)
- Alonzo Church, A Bibliography of Symbolic Logic, 1666–1935 (ISBN 978-0-8218-0084-3)
- C. Anthony Anderson and Michael Zelëny, (eds.), Logic, Meaning and Computation: Essays in Memory of Alonzo Church (ISBN 978-1-4020-0141-3)
- Tyler Burge and Herbert Enderton (eds.), The Collected Works of Alonzo Church (2019) (ISBN 978-0-262-02564-5)

== See also ==
- Church–Turing–Deutsch principle
- Higher-order logic
- List of pioneers in computer science
- Modern Platonism
- Universal set
