= Katalin Bimbó =

Logician

Katalin Bimbó (born 1963) is a logician and philosopher known for her books on mathematical logic and proof theory. She earned a Ph.D. in 1999 at Indiana University Bloomington, under the supervision of Jon Michael Dunn, and is a professor of philosophy at the University of Alberta after having earned tenure there in 2013.

== Selected works ==
=== Monographs ===
- Generalized Galois Logics: Relational Semantics of Nonclassical Logical Calculi (with J. M. Dunn, CSLI Publications, 2008)
- Combinatory Logic: Pure, Applied and Typed (CRC Press, 2012)
- Proof Theory: Sequent Calculi and Related Formalisms (CRC Press, 2015)

=== Edited volumes ===
- J. Michael Dunn on Information Based Logics (Outstanding Contributions to Logic, volume 8; Springer, 2016).
- Relevance Logics and other Tools for Reasoning. Essays in Honor of J. Michael Dunn (Tributes, volume 46; College Publications, London, United Kingdom, 2022).
