= Alan Ross Anderson =

American logician (1925–1973)

- Born: April 11, 1925; Portland, Oregon, U.S.
- Died: 1973; Pittsburgh, Pennsylvania, U.S.

Academic background
- Education: Yale University
- Thesis: A Finitary System of Logic (1955)
- Doctoral advisor: Frederic Brenton Fitch

Academic work
- Institutions: Yale University, University of Pittsburgh
- Doctoral students: Nuel Belnap, Alasdair Urquhart

Alan Ross Anderson (1925–1973) was an American logician and professor of philosophy at Yale University and the University of Pittsburgh.

A frequent collaborator with Nuel Belnap, Anderson was instrumental in the development of relevance logic and deontic logic.

== Relevance logic ==
Anderson believed that the conclusion of a valid inference ought to have something to do with (i.e. be relevant to) the premises. Formally, he captured this "relevance condition" with the principle that

A entails B only if A and B share at least one non-logical constant.

As simple as this idea appears, implementing it in a formal system requires a radical departure from the semantics of classical logic. Anderson and Belnap (with contributions from J. Michael Dunn, Kit Fine, Alasdair Urquhart, Robert K. Meyer, Anil Gupta, and others) explored the formal consequences of the relevance condition in great detail in their influential Entailment books (see references below), which are the most frequently cited works in the field of relevance logic.

Anderson and Belnap were quick to observe that the concept of relevance had been central to logic since Aristotle, but had been unduly neglected since Gottlob Frege and George Boole laid the foundations for what would come to be known, somewhat ironically, as "classical" logic. (For an example of classical logic's failure to satisfy the relevance condition, see the article on the principle of explosion.)

== Deontic logic ==
Anderson advocated the view that sentences of the form "It ought to be (the case) that A" should be interpreted logically as:

- Not-A entails v,

where v means something like a norm has been violated. He developed systems of deontic relevance logic containing a special constant v (notation varies) for this purpose. Such systems have sometimes been characterized as "reductions" of deontic logic to alethic modal logic. This is misleading at best, however, since alethic modal logics generally do not contain anything like Anderson's special v constant.

== Philosophy of logic ==
Anderson was known for being a Platonist (or realist, or monist) about logic; he believed in "The One True Logic," and he believed that it was a relevance logic.

== Bibliography ==
- Anderson, A. R. 1967. Some nasty problems in the formal logic of ethics. Nous I(4): 345-60.
- Anderson, A. R. and Belnap, N. D. 1975. Entailment: The Logic of Relevance and Necessity. Vol. 1. Princeton: Princeton University Press.
- Anderson, A. R., Belnap, N. D., and Dunn, J. M. 1992. Entailment: The Logic of Relevance and Necessity. Vol. 2. Princeton: Princeton University Press. ISBN 0-691-07339-2
