= John Kekes =

American philosophy professor (born 1936)

John Kekes (/kɛks/; born 22 November 1936) is an American philosopher. He serves as Professor Emeritus of Philosophy at the University at Albany, SUNY.

== Education ==
Kekes received his Ph.D. in philosophy from the Australian National University.

== Work ==
Kekes is the author of a number of books on ethics, including The Examined Life (Penn State University Press, 1988), The Morality of Pluralism (Princeton University Press, 1996), Moral Wisdom and Good Lives (Cornell University Press, 1997), The Art of Life (Cornell University Press, 2005), The Roots of Evil (Cornell University Press, 2007), Enjoyment (Oxford University Press, 2009), and The Enlargement of Life: Moral Imagination at Work (Cornell University Press, 2010).

Kekes is also a noted conservative thinker. His works on political philosophy include Against Liberalism (Cornell University Press, 1988), A Case for Conservatism (Cornell University Press, 1998), The Illusions of Egalitarianism (Cornell University Press, 2007) and The Art of Politics: The New Betrayal of America and How to Resist It (Encounter, 2008). A shorter summary of some of Kekes's objections to modern liberalism, specifically the influence of philosophers John Rawls and Ronald Dworkin, can be found in his 2001 article "Dangerous Egalitarian Dreams".

== Bibliography ==
- Moral Tradition and Individualism, Princeton University press (1991).
- Facing Evil, Princeton University press (1993).
- Moral Wisdom and Good Lives, Cornell University Press (1995).
- The Morality of Pluralism, Princeton University press (1996).
- A Case for Conservatism, Cornell University Press (1998).
- Against Liberalism, Cornell University Press (1999).
- The Illusions of Egalitarianism, Cornell University Press (2007).
- The Roots of Evil, Cornell University Press (2007).
- Enjoyment: The Moral Significance of Styles of Life, Oxford University Press (2010).
- The Nature of Philosophical Problems: Their Causes and Implications, Oxford University Press (2014).
- How Should We Live?: A Practical Approach to Everyday Morality, University of Chicago Press (2014).
- The Human Condition, Oxford University Press (2014).
- Human Predicaments: And What to Do about Them, University of Chicago Press (2016).
