= Computational philosophy =

Use of computational techniques in philosophy

Computational philosophy or digital philosophy is the use of computational techniques in philosophy. It includes concepts such as computational models, algorithms, simulations, games, etc. that help in the research and teaching of philosophical concepts, as well as specialized online encyclopedias and graphical visualizations of relationships among philosophers and concepts. The use of computers in philosophy has gained momentum as computer power and the availability of data have increased greatly. This, along with the development of many new techniques that use those computers and data, has opened many new ways of doing philosophy that were not available before. It has also led to new insights in philosophy.

== Sources ==
- Grim, Patrick; Singer, Daniel (Spring 2020). "Computational Philosophy". In Zalta, Edward N. (ed.). Stanford Encyclopedia of Philosophy.
- Grim, Patrick (13 December 2019). "Editorial introduction to the Topical Issue 'Computer Modeling in Philosophy'". Open Philosophy. 2 (1): 653–656. doi:10.1515/opphil-2019-0049.
