= Alasdair Urquhart =

Scottish-Canadian logician (born 1945)

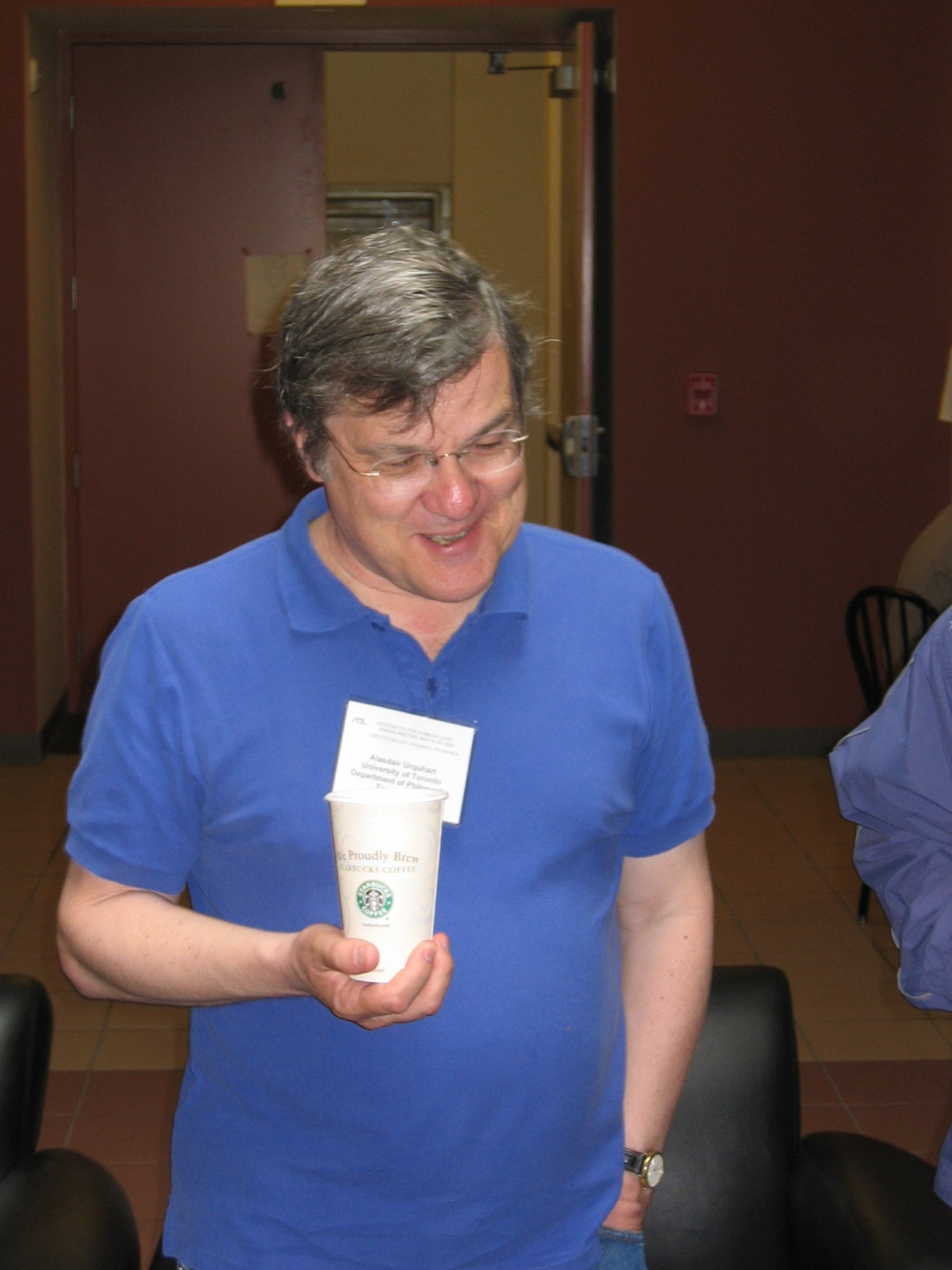
- Urquhart at the Association for Symbolic Logic (Pittsburgh)
- Born: Alasdair Ian Fenton Urquhart; 20 December 1945 (age 80); Auchtermuchty, Fife, Scotland

Academic background
- Education: University of Edinburgh (MA); University of Pittsburgh (PhD)
- Thesis: The Semantics of Entailment (1973)
- Doctoral advisor: Alan Ross Anderson; Nuel Belnap

Academic work
- Discipline: Philosophy
- Sub-discipline: Non-classical logic
- Institutions: University of Toronto

Alasdair Ian Fenton Urquhart (/ˈæləsdər ˈɜːrkərt/ AL-ist-ər UR-kərt; born 20 December 1945) is a Scottish–Canadian philosopher and emeritus professor of philosophy at the University of Toronto. He has made contributions to the field of logic, especially non-classical logic. Amongst his most notable accomplishments is the proof of undecidability of the relevance logic R. He published numerous scientific papers in theoretical computer science venues, mostly on mathematical logic topics of relevance to computer science.

== Early life ==
Urquhart is a native of Scotland. He received his MA in philosophy from the University of Edinburgh in 1967. He then attended the University of Pittsburgh, receiving an MA and Ph.D. in 1973 under the supervision of Alan Ross Anderson and Nuel Belnap.

== Career ==
From 1973 to 1975, Urquhart was an assistant professor at the University of Toronto Mississauga (then known as Erindale College). He became an associate professor there in 1975. Starting in 1986, Urquhart was a professor of philosophy in the University of Toronto Faculty of Arts and Science.

From 1983 to 1989, Urquhart was a consulting editor for the Journal of Symbolic Logic. He was also an editor of Canadian Philosophical Monographs. In 2003, he became the managing editor of reviews for The Bulletin of Symbolic Logic.

He is currently on the Council of the Division for Logic, Methodology and Philosophy of Science and Technology of the International Union of History and Philosophy of Science and Technology (2020–2023).

== Selected publications ==
- Urquhart, Alasdair and Rescher, Nicholas. Temporal Logic. New York: Springer Verlag, 1971. ISBN 978-3-7091-7664-1
- Urquhart, Alasdair. "The Undecidability of Entailment and Relevant Implication." Journal of Symbolic Logic 49:4 (1984): 1059–1073.
- Urquhart, Alasdair and Cook, Stephen A. "Functional Interpretations of Feasibly Constructive Arithmetic", Annals of Pure and Applied Logic, 1993; preliminary version at STOC'89
- "The Complexity of Decision Procedures in Relevance Logic II", Journal of Symbolic Logic 64:4 (1999): 1774–1802.
