= Maurice L'Abbé =

Canadian academic and mathematician

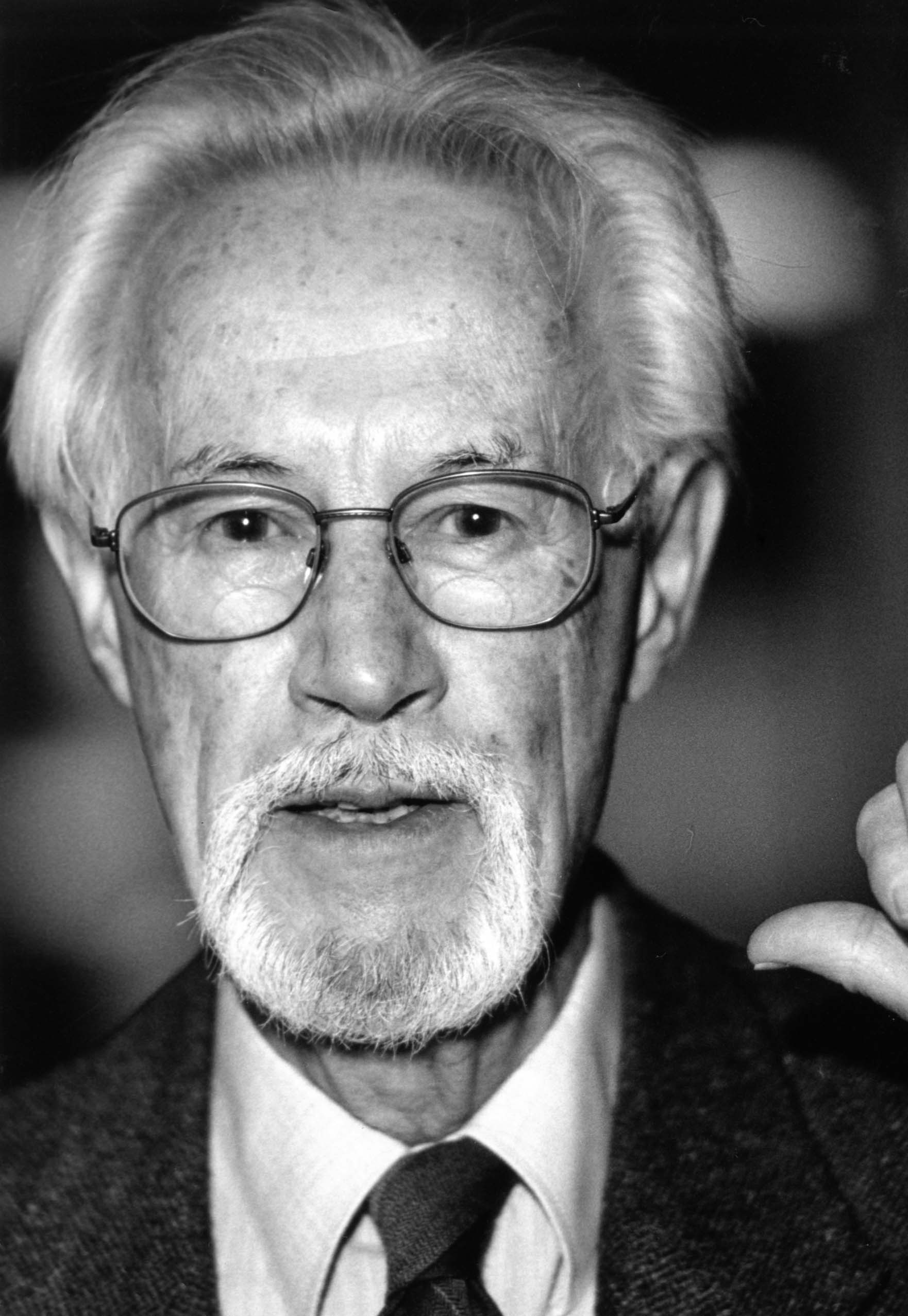
- L'Abbé in 1996
- Born: 1920; Ottawa, Ontario, Canada
- Died: July 21, 2006
- Occupation(s): Mathematician, academic

Maurice L'Abbé (1920 – July 21, 2006) was a Canadian academic and mathematician.

Born in Ottawa, Ontario, L'Abbé obtained his license in mathematics in 1945 from the Université de Montréal, and a doctorate in mathematics from the Princeton University in 1951. He joined the faculty of science in the Université de Montréal becoming an associate professor in 1950 and full professor in 1956. He was director of the Université de Montréal's Department of Mathematics from 1957 to 1968. He was dean of the Faculty of Science from 1964 to 1968 and Vice-Rector for Research from 1968 to 1978.

In 1968, he helped to establish the Centre de Recherches Mathématiques, the first mathematical research institute in Canada.

== Honours ==
In 1993, he was made an Officer of the National Order of Quebec. In 1994, he was awarded the Prix Armand-Frappier.
