= Patrick Grim =

American philosopher

- Born: Patrick Neal Grim; October 29, 1950 (age 76)
- Citizenship: United States

Education
- Education: Boston University (PhD, 1976); University of St Andrews (BPhil, 1975); University of California, Santa Cruz (A.B. Anthropology, Philosophy, 1971)

Philosophical work
- Era: Contemporary philosophy
- Region: Western philosophy
- Institutions: State University of New York at Stony Brook; University of Michigan at Ann Arbor
- Main interests: Philosophy of religion, Computational philosophy, Philosophy of logic, Philosophy of science

Patrick Grim is an American philosopher. He has published on epistemic questions in philosophy of religion, as well as topics in philosophy of science, philosophy of logic, computational philosophy, and agent-based modeling. He is author, co-author or editor of seven books in philosophical logic, philosophy of mind, philosophy of science and computational philosophy. He is currently editor of the American Philosophical Quarterly and founding co-editor of over forty volumes of The Philosopher’s Annual, an attempt to collect the ten best philosophy articles of the year. Grim's popular work includes four video lecture series on value theory, informal logic, and philosophy of mind for The Great Courses. Grim's academic posts have included Distinguished Teaching Professor of Philosophy (Emeritus) at the State University of New York at Stony Brook, Distinguished Visiting Professor in Philosophy at the University of Michigan at Ann Arbor, and fellowships and lectureships at the Center for Complex Systems at the University of Michigan at Ann Arbor and at the Center for Philosophy of Science at the University of Pittsburgh.

The classic picture of the philosopher is as an individual working alone with quill and paper. Formal philosophy may take the form of theorems. Grim violates that picture in two respects: he is known as an innovator in computational philosophy, working extensively with computer modeling, and his work has often been conducted using a research team. Starting with work leading up to The Philosophical Computer, Grim, Paul St. Denis, and Gary Mar used results from chaos theory and fractal geometry as an inspiration for modeling self-reference in infinite-valued logics and embodied game theory within cellular automata to obtain results regarding the evolution of cooperation and the computational universality and formal undecidability of the spatialized prisoner’s dilemma. In later work with other research teams he developed models of meaning, language acquisition, and Gricean pragmatics using simple agents embedded in a spatialized cellular automata environment of predators and prey and with learning techniques including simple imitation, localized genetic algorithm, and neural nets. Similar tools were applied with another team to questions of prejudice reduction, with an eye to the contact hypothesis in social psychology and using graphic models of model robustness. Leading a strongly cross-disciplinary team under the auspices of the Modeling Infectious Disease Agent Study, Grim developed network models of health-care belief dynamics and polarization in Black and White communities based on data from the Greater Pittsburgh Random Household Health Survey. Grim turned to models of scientific communication on epistemic landscapes, which branched out to models of differences in network information transfer by way of ‘germs, genes, and memes.’ With a particularly long-lasting research team, his work has used agent-based modeling in focussing on issues of opinion polarization, with implications for political representation structures, the dynamics of jury deliberations, and formal measures of polarization. The role of expertise in group deliberations has also been part of the picture. Most recently, and with a further research group, Grim has developed Bayesian network models of scientific theories as ‘webs of belief,’ drawing implications regarding theory-sensitivity to evidence at different points and a Kuhnian punctuated equilibrium of scientific change.

Within philosophy of religion, Grim is known for a Cantorian argument against the possibility of omniscience. In its simplest and original set-theoretic form (elaborated and buttressed in later work):

There can be no set of all truths. Given any set of truths T, there will be a power set PT of all subsets of that set. For each element of that power set there will be a unique truth: that a chosen truth t is or is not a member of that subset, for example. But by Cantor’s theorem the power set PS of any set is larger than the set S itself: any one-to-one mapping of elements of IS to elements of S is bound to leave some element of PS out. Any set of truths will therefore leave some truth out: there can be no set of all truths. But what an omniscient being would have to know would appear to be precisely a set of all truths. There can therefore be no omniscient being.

== Books ==
- The Philosopher’s Annual, Volumes I through XLI. Founding co-editor. Basil Blackwell, Rowman and Littlefield, Ridgeview Press, CSLI and Univ. of Chicago Press, now online at www.philosophersannual.org. 1979-2022.
- Philosophy of Science and the Occult. Editor. SUNY Press, 1st edition 1982, 2nd edition 1990.
- The Incomplete Universe: Totality, Knowledge, and Truth. MIT Press, 1991.
- The Philosophical Computer: Exploratory Essays in Philosophical Computer Modeling. With Gary Mar and Paul St. Denis. MIT Press, 1998.
- Mind & Consciousness: 5 Questions Interviews with Ned Block, David Chalmers, Daniel Dennett, Frank Jackson, Hilary Putnam, John Searle, Galen Strawson, and others working in Philosophy of Mind and Cognitive Science. VIP Automatic Press, 2009.
- Beyond Sets: Toward A Theory of Collectivities. with Nicholas Rescher. Ontos Verlag, 2011.
- Reflexivity: From Paradox to Consciousness. with Nicholas Rescher. Ontos Verlag, 2012.
- Theory of Categories. Key Instruments of Human Understanding with Nicholas Rescher. Anthem, 2023.

== Selected articles and book chapters ==
● Patrick Grim, Frank Seidl, Calum McNamara, Isabell N. Astor, and Caroline Diaso, “The Punctuated Equilibrium of Scientific Change: A Bayesian Network Model,” Synthese 200 (2022): 1-25.

● Patrick Grim, Trina Kokalis, Ali Alai-Tafti, Nick Kilb, and Paul St. Denis, "Making Meaning Happen," Journal for Experimental and Theoretical Artificial Intelligence 16 (2004), 209-244.

● Patrick Grim, "Simulating Grice: Emergent Pragmatics in Spatialized Game Theory," in Anton Benz, Christian Ebert, and Robert van Rooij, Language, Games, and Evolution, Springer-Verlag, 2011.

● Patrick Grim, Daniel J. Singer, Aaron Bramson, Bennett Holman, Sean McGeehan & William J. Berger, “Diversity, Ability and Expertise in Epistemic Communities,” Philosophy of Science 86 (2019): 98-123.

● Patrick Grim, Daniel J. Singer, Steven Fisher, Aaron Bramson, William J. Berger, Christopher Reade, Flocken and Adam Sales “Scientific Networks on Data Landscapes: Question Difficulty, Epistemic Success, and Convergence,” Episteme 10 (2013), 441-464.

● Patrick Grim, Daniel J. Singer, Christopher Reade, and Steven Fisher, “Germs, Genes, and Memes: Functional and Fitness Dynamics on Information Networks,” Philosophy of Science 82 (2015),

● Patrick Grim, "Threshold Phenomena in Epistemic Networks," Proceedings, AAAI Fall Symposium on Complex Adaptive Systems and the Threshold Effect, FS-09-03, AAAI Press 2009.

● Patrick Grim, Evan Selinger, William Braynen, Robert Rosnberger, Randy Au, Nancy Louie, and John Connolly, "Modeling Prejudice Reduction: Spatialized Game Theory and the Contact Hypothesis," Public Affairs Quarterly 19 (2005), 95-126.

● Aaron Bramson, Patrick Grim, Daniel J. Singer, William J. Berger, Graham Sack, Steven Fisher, Carissa Flocken, and Bennett Holman, “Understanding Polarization: Meanings, Measures, and Model Evaluation,” Philosophy of Science 84 (2017), 115-159.

● Patrick Grim, "The Undecidability of the Spatialized Prisoner's Dilemma," Theory and Decision 42 (1997), 53-80.
