= Bob Meyer (logician) =

American philosopher

Robert Kenneth Meyer (27 May 1932 – 6 May 2009) was a logician and professor emeritus at the Australian National University.

First trained to be a minister at the Union Congregational Church by the Princeton Theological Seminary in 1956, he completed his graduate studies in philosophy and logic at the University of Pittsburgh. He moved to Australia and joined the Australian National University in 1974. He worked on the semantics of relevant logic.

He was the Maximum Leader for the Logicians Liberation League, and drafted its manifesto.

Meyer died of lung cancer on 6 May 2009, aged 76, in Canberra, Australia.

Was married to peace activist Barbara (Bobi) Lee Meyer.

Survived by Children: Nancy, Judy, Gail, Bob Junior, Carl, Jay, Vandy, Dorothy, Billy, Maria and Gisela.
