= Nuel Belnap =

American philosopher (1930–2024)

- Born: Nuel Dinsmore Belnap Jr. May 1, 1930; Evanston, Illinois, U.S.
- Died: June 12, 2024 (aged 94); Whitefield, New Hampshire, U.S.

Education
- Education: University of Illinois; Yale University (PhD, 1960)
- Thesis: The Formalization of Entailment (1960)
- Doctoral advisor: Alan Ross Anderson

Philosophical work
- Era: Contemporary philosophy
- Region: Western philosophy
- School: Analytic; Pittsburgh school
- Institutions: University of Pittsburgh
- Doctoral students: Jon Michael Dunn; Ruth Manor; John F. Horty; Alasdair Urquhart
- Main interests: Philosophical logic, temporal logic, structural proof theory
- Notable ideas: Display logic

Nuel Dinsmore Belnap Jr. (/ˈbɛlnæp/; May 1, 1930 – June 12, 2024) was an American logician and philosopher who has made contributions to the philosophy of logic, temporal logic, and structural proof theory. He taught at the University of Pittsburgh from 1963 until his retirement in 2011.

== Early life and education ==
Belnap was born on May 1, 1930. He attended New Trier High School in Winnetka, Illinois, and earned a Bachelor of Arts degree from the University of Illinois. He recalled Max Fisch assigned Whitehead readings.

Belnap worked as a programmer on the IBM 701 for the National Security Agency through the United States Air Force for two years before attending graduate school at Yale University. He enjoyed metaphysics, and his professors included Paul Weiss, Arthur Pap, Henry Margenau, Frederic Fitch, and Rulon Wells.

On a Fulbright Fellowship in 1958 he went to Louvain to study with Canon Robert Feys. Belnap domiciled in Brussels with wife and 2-year-old. Feys directed Belnap to read Wilhelm Ackermann's article on rigorous implication in the Journal of Symbolic Logic.

Alan Ross Anderson and Belnap began to discuss relevant implication. In 1960 Anderson told Belnap to write up the work he had done on relevance logic, and this was Belnap's PhD dissertation at Yale (entitled The Formalization of Entailment). The dissertation was published through Omar Kayam Moore at Office of Naval Research, Group Psychology Branch.

== Career ==
Belnap became an assistant professor at Yale. He recalled hiring Jon Barwise and John Wallace as research assistants.

The University of Pittsburgh wanted Wilfrid Sellars, and according to Belnap, "Jerry Sneewind and I hung on his coattails." Adolf Grunbaum and Nicholas Rescher were at Pittsburgh. Vice chancellor Charlie Peake brought Alan Anderson to Pittsburgh in 1965, where he worked until his death in 1973. Anderson and Belnap were co-authors of Entailment: The Logic of Relevance and Necessity. "The way we worked when we worked together was cheek by jaw. We just sat down and wrote sentences together."

Belnap became full professor in 1966. Kurt Baier was department chairman. Belnap began to teach philosophy of social sciences, with students including Bas van Fraassen and Jon Michael Dunn. In 1967 he became professor of sociology and in 1971 professor philosophy of science. Eventually he occupied the endowed chair named for Alan Ross Anderson. He recalled Rich Tomason, student of intelligent systems, passing through Pitt.

Wary of consequences of contradictory stored data, Belnap proposed a four-valued logic to avoid run-away inferences such as (A & ~A) → B for an arbitrary statement B. Known as the principle of explosion in classical logic, the four-valued logic provides a basis for paraconsistent logic to avoid this pathology of two-valued logic.

In 1976 Belnap and T. B. Steel Jr. published The Logic of Questions and Answers as a timely contribution to erotetics. Beyond propositional logic, they noted that the evolving databases make possible "dossier files on individuals" (page 146) leading to the "problem of privacy in record keeping." The book included a 45-page annotated bibliography of erotetics, sectioned by philosophy, linguistics, automatic question-answering, and pedagogy, compiled by Hubert Schleichert and Urs Egli.

On sabbatical, Belnap was visiting professor at the University of California, Irvine and at Indiana University Bloomington, in the falls of 1977, 1978, 1979 with Jon Michael Dunn. In 1982 at Stanford's Center for Advanced Studies in the Behavioral Sciences, and in 1996 at Leipzig, Centrum für Höhere Studien with Heirich Wansing. He was a founding member of the Society for Exact Philosophy, which collaborated with Canadians such as Mario Bunge. Belnap has served as referee for many academic papers.

In 1992, Belnap published Branching space-time, which offers a logical framework attempting to bridge relativity and quantum indeterminism, and offers an interpretation to EPR-type experiments.

He was elected a Fellow of the American Academy of Arts and Sciences in 2008.

== Personal life and death ==
Belnap had three sons and a daughter with his first wife, Joan Gohde Belnap. He died in Whitefield, New Hampshire on June 12, 2024, at the age of 94.

== Selected works ==
- 1975: (with Dorothy L. Grover & Joseph L. Camp) "The Prosentential Theory of Truth", Philosophical Studies 27(1): 73–125
- 1993: (with Anil Gupta) The Revision Theory of Truth, MIT Press
- 2001: (with Ming Xu and Michel Perloff) Facing the Future: agents and choices in our indeterministic world, Oxford University Press (ISBN 0195138783).

== See also ==
- Logical harmony
