= Joel David Hamkins =

American mathematician

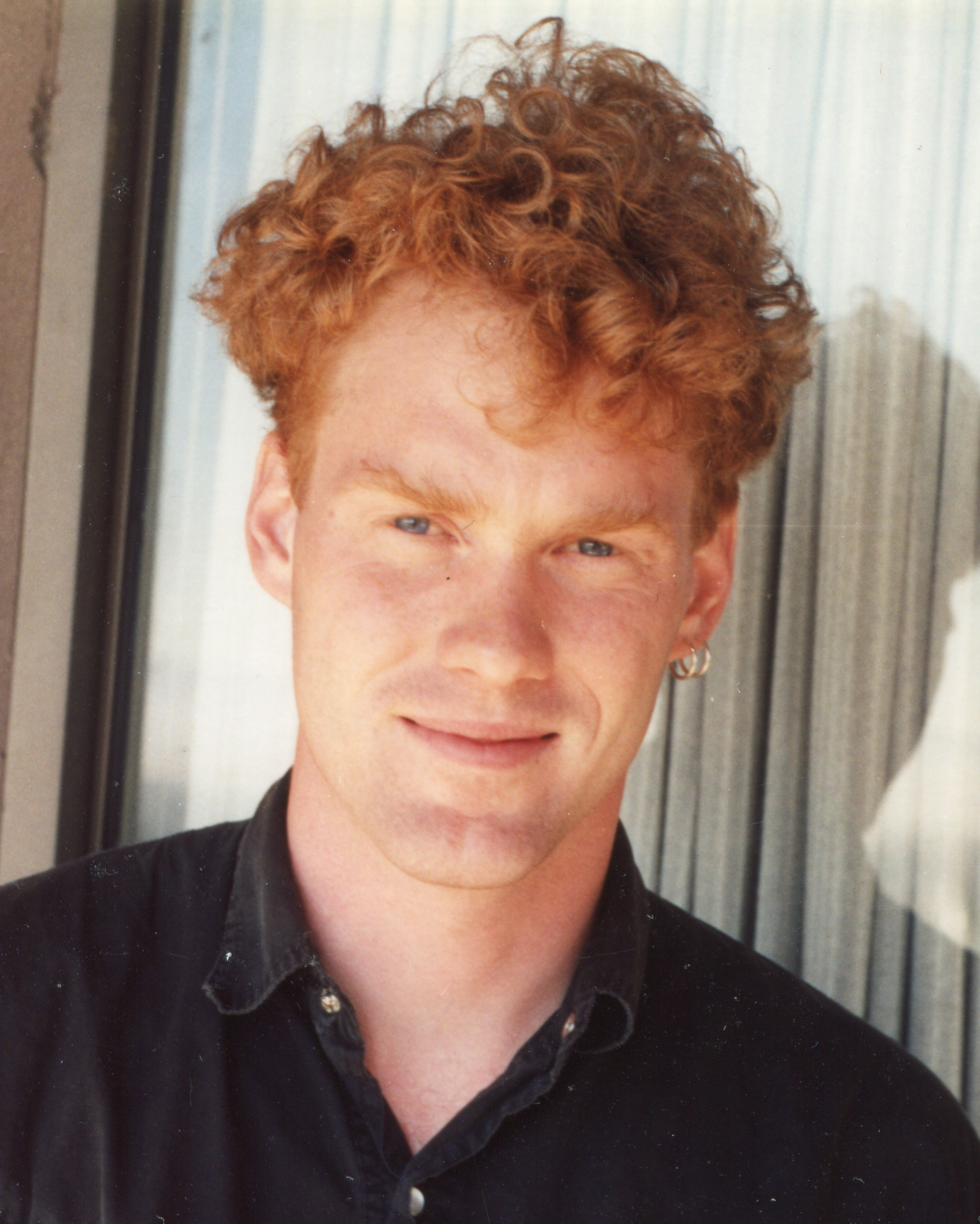
- Born: 1966
- Education: University of California, Berkeley; California Institute of Technology
- Scientific career
- Fields: Mathematics, philosophy
- Workplaces: University of Notre Dame; University of Oxford; City University of New York
- Doctoral advisor: W. Hugh Woodin

Joel David Hamkins (born 1966) is an American mathematician and philosopher who is the John Cardinal O'Hara Professor of Logic at the University of Notre Dame. He has made contributions in mathematical and philosophical logic, set theory and philosophy of set theory (particularly the idea of the set-theoretic multiverse), in computability theory, and in group theory.

== Biography ==
After earning a Bachelor of Science in mathematics at the California Institute of Technology, Hamkins earned his Ph.D. in mathematics in 1994 at the University of California, Berkeley under the supervision of W. Hugh Woodin, with a dissertation entitled Lifting and Extending Measures by Forcing; Fragile Measurability. He joined the faculty of the City University of New York in 1995, where he was a member of the doctoral faculties in Mathematics, in Philosophy and in Computer Science at the CUNY Graduate Center and professor of mathematics at the College of Staten Island. He has also held various faculty or visiting fellow positions at University of California at Berkeley, Kobe University, Carnegie Mellon University, University of Münster, Georgia State University, University of Amsterdam, the Fields Institute, New York University and the Isaac Newton Institute.

In September 2018, Hamkins moved to the University of Oxford to become Professor of Logic in the Faculty of Philosophy and Sir Peter Strawson Fellow in Philosophy in University College, Oxford. In January 2022 he moved to the University of Notre Dame as the John Cardinal O'Hara Professor of Logic.

== Research contributions ==
Hamkins research work is cited, and he gives talks, including events for the general public. Hamkins was interviewed on his research by Richard Marshall in 2013 for 3:AM Magazine, as part of an ongoing interview series for that magazine of prominent philosophers and public intellectuals, and he is occasionally interviewed by the popular science media about issues in the philosophy of mathematics.

=== Set theory ===
In set theory, Hamkins has investigated the indestructibility phenomenon of large cardinals, proving that small forcing necessarily ruins the indestructibility of supercompact and other large cardinals and introducing the lottery preparation as a general method of forcing indestructibility. Hamkins introduced the modal logic of forcing and proved with Benedikt Löwe that if ZFC is consistent, then the ZFC-provably valid principles of forcing are exactly those in the modal theory known as S4.2. Hamkins, Linetsky and Reitz proved that every countable model of Gödel-Bernays set theory has a class forcing extension to a pointwise definable model, in which every set and class is definable without parameters. Hamkins and Reitz introduced the ground axiom, which asserts that the set-theoretic universe is not a forcing extension of any inner model by set forcing. Hamkins proved that any two countable models of set theory are comparable by embeddability, and in particular that every countable model of set theory embeds into its own constructible universe.

=== Philosophy of set theory ===
In his philosophical work, Hamkins has defended a multiverse perspective of mathematical truth, arguing that diverse concepts of set give rise to different set-theoretic universes with different theories of mathematical truth. He argues that the Continuum Hypothesis question, for example, "is settled on the multiverse view by our extensive knowledge about how it behaves in the multiverse, and as a result it can no longer be settled in the manner formerly hoped for." (Hamkins 2012) Elliott Mendelson writes of Hamkins's work on the set-theoretic multiverse that, "the resulting study is an array of new fantastic, and sometimes bewildering, concepts and results that already have yielded a flowering of what amounts to a new branch of set theory. This ground-breaking paper gives us a glimpse of the amazingly fecund developments spearheaded by the author and...others..."

=== Potentialism ===
Hamkins has investigated a model-theoretic account of the philosophy of potentialism. In joint work with Øystein Linnebo, he introduced several varieties of set-theoretic potentialism. He gave a similar analysis for potentialist concepts in arithmetic, treating the models of PA under a variety of natural extension concepts, using especially the universal algorithm of W. Hugh Woodin. In further joint work, Hamkins and Woodin provided a set-theoretic generalization of that result. Hamkins mounted a general account of modal model theory in joint work with his Oxford DPhil student Wojciech Aleksander Wołoszyn.

=== Infinitary computability ===
Hamkins introduced with Jeff Kidder and Andy Lewis the theory of infinite-time Turing machines, a part of the subject of hypercomputation, with connections to descriptive set theory.

In other computability work, Hamkins and Miasnikov proved that the classical halting problem for Turing machines, although undecidable, is nevertheless decidable on a set of asymptotic probability one, one of several results in generic-case complexity showing that a difficult or unsolvable problem can be easy on average.

=== Group theory ===
In group theory, Hamkins proved that every group has a terminating transfinite automorphism tower. With Simon Thomas, he proved that the height of the automorphism tower of a group can be modified by forcing.

=== Infinite games ===
Hamkins has investigated several infinitary games, including infinite chess, infinite draughts, infinite Hex, and others. On the topic of infinite chess, Hamkins, Brumleve and Schlicht proved that the mate-in-n problem of infinite chess is decidable. Hamkins and Evans investigated transfinite game values in infinite chess, proving that every countable ordinal arises as the game value of a position in infinite three-dimensional chess. Hamkins and Davide Leonessi proved that every countable ordinal arises as a game value in infinite draughts. They also proved that infinite Hex is a draw.

=== Juggling theory ===
As an undergraduate at Caltech in the 1980s, Hamkins made contributions to the mathematical theory of juggling, working with Bruce Tiemann to develop what became known as the siteswap juggling notation.

== MathOverflow ==
Hamkins is the top-rated user by reputation score on MathOverflow. Gil Kalai describes him as "one of those distinguished mathematicians whose arrays of MO answers in their areas of interest draw coherent deep pictures for these areas that you probably cannot find anywhere else."
