= Sun Guangyuan =

Chinese mathematician

Sun Guangyuan (simplified Chinese: 孙光远; traditional Chinese: 孫光遠; pinyin: Sūn Guāngyuǎn; Wade–Giles: Sun Kuang-yüan, 1900–1979), also known as Sun Tang (孫鎕), was a Chinese mathematician.

He studied projective geometry under Ernest Preston Lane at the University of Chicago. Later Sun became a professor in Tsinghua University, Beijing.

Sun used Ernest Julius Wilczynski's expression of a ruled surface given via two linear homogeneous differential equations in a 1927 publication.
