= Mayme Logsdon =

American mathematician (1881-1967)

Mayme Farmer Irwin Logsdon (February 1, 1881 – July 4, 1967) was an American mathematician known for her research in algebraic geometry and mathematics education. She was the first woman to receive tenure in the University of Chicago mathematics department.

== Career ==
Logsdon taught at a high school from 1900 to 1911 before she decided to return to school herself. She earned a Ph.B., S.M., and Ph.D. in mathematics from the University of Chicago in 1913, 1915, and 1921 respectively. Her doctoral advisor was L. E. Dickson. She taught at Hastings College from 1913 to 1917 and at Northwestern University from 1917 to 1919. She then returned to her alma mater in 1921 where she was the only female regular faculty member above the rank of instructor until 1982 when Karen Uhlenbeck was appointed professor of mathematics. Logsdon remained at the University of Chicago for a large portion of her career, until 1946, when Univ. of Chicago forced her to retire at 65 years old. She moved to Florida and continued her career by teaching another 15 years at University of Miami, retiring in 1961.

Students at the University of Chicago include Anna A. Stafford (Henriques) (PhD), James Edward Case (PhD), Clyde Harvey Graves (PhD), Frank Ayres Jr (PhD) and Abba Verbeck Newton (MS).

Logsdon wrote two texts Elementary Mathematical Analysis (1932 volume 1 and 1933 volume 2) and A Mathematician Explains (1st edition 1935; 2nd edition 1936) both for undergraduate mathematics.

Logsdon was a fellow of the International Education Board, a member of the American Association for the Advancement of Science, the American Mathematical Society, the Mathematical Association of America, and the director of the American Association of University Women (1929–1935).
