= Abba Verbeck Newton =

American mathematician (1908–1996)

- Born: February 19, 1908; Ballston Spa, New York
- Died: May 5, 1996 (aged 88); Poughkeepsie, New York
- Burial place: Ballston Spa Cemetery
- Education: Mount Holyoke College; University of Chicago
- Occupation: Professor
- Known for: Earning a math PhD before the start of World War II

Abba Verbeck Newton (February 19, 1908 – May 5, 1996) was a pioneering American mathematician, one of the few women who earned a PhD in mathematics in the United States before the start of World War II.

== Biography ==
Abba Verbeck Newton was one of two daughters born to Samuel Smith Newton and Sarah C. Verbeck in Ballston Spa, New York. Her parents, wed in 1905, were born in Albany and Ballston Spa, New York, respectively. Samuel Newton worked in Ballston Spa for the American Hide and Leather Company and both Abba and her older sister Katharine Marguerite (1906–1994) were born there.

=== Education ===
Newton went to Ballston Spa High School in New York 1920–1924 and St. Margaret's School in Waterbury, Connecticut, 1924–1925. She enrolled in Mount Holyoke College and earned her BA there in 1929, graduating magna cum laude with majors in both mathematics and chemistry. Her first job was teaching math at Science Hill School, which was a girls' preparatory school in Shelbyville, Kentucky. During the summer of 1930, she studied mathematics education at Teachers College, Columbia University, in New York. Immediately after that, she headed for the University of Chicago to study math and was there full time from 1930 through 1933 with the help of a scholarship 1932–1933. She earned her master's degree in 1931, under the direction of Mayme Logsdon. She followed with her doctorate, directed by Ernest Preston Lane, awarded in 1933, based on her dissertation titled Consecutive Covariant Configurations at a Point of a Space Curve.

=== Professor ===
Newton's PhD did not help her find employment in 1933 during the time of the Great Depression. In April 1934, she was offered a teaching assignment to fill in for an absent instructor at the American International College in Springfield, Massachusetts.

Finally, in 1944, Newton was named an assistant professor at Vassar College in Poughkeepsie, New York. She stayed at Vassar for 29 years during which time she was promoted to associate professor in 1950 and then full professor in 1957. Three times, she chaired the college's math department (1950–1951, 1953–1958, and 1966–1967), and when she retired in 1973, she was named professor emeritus. During her years at Vassar, Newton served as a faculty fellow at the Institute Henri Poincaré at the Sorbonne, Paris, France in 1951 and at Duke University in North Carolina in 1966. In addition, she served as an NSF science faculty fellow at the University of Michigan 1958–1959 and a visiting research fellow at Princeton in 1971.

=== Later years ===
When Newton retired from Vassar, she remained in Poughkeepsie. She continued to spend time with tennis, rowing, and hiking and was active in the Adirondack Mountain Club through the 1980s. She was also a trustee of St. Margaret's School for five years and participated on the county World Affairs council.

Newton was 88 when she died on May 5, 1996, at Eden Park Nursing Home in Poughkeepsie. She was buried in the family plot in the Ballston Spa Cemetery.
