= Charles Thompson Sullivan =

Canadian mathematician (1884–1948)

Charles Thompson Sullivan, FRSC (9 September 1882, Manchester, Nova Scotia – 17 September 1948, Montreal) was a Canadian mathematician.

== Education and career ==
Sullivan graduated with B.A. in 1906 from Dalhousie University and was Science Master at Alberta College, Edmonton from 1906 to 1908. He enrolled as a graduate student in 1908 at McGill University and graduated there with M.Sc. in 1909. In 1910 he became a lecturer in mathematics at McGill. At the University of Chicago he attended summer quarters in 1909 and in 1910 and (with a leave of absence from McGill) 4 consecutive quarters in 1911-1912, graduating with a Ph.D. from the University of Chicago in 1912. His thesis advisor was Ernest Julius Wilczynski. After completing his Ph.D., Sullivan returned to McGill. He was the chair of the mathematics department of McGill University for 16 years, starting in 1930. He retired in 1947.

He was an Invited Speaker of the ICM in 1924 at Toronto.

== Selected publications ==
- "Properties of surfaces whose asymptotic curves belong to linear complexes." Transactions of the American Mathematical Society. 15 (1914): 167–196. doi:10.1090/S0002-9947-1914-1500971-7
- "Scroll directrix curves." Transactions of the American Mathematical Society 16 (1915): 199–214. doi:10.2307/1988717
- "The determination of plane nets characterized by certain properties of their Laplace transforms." Bulletin of the American Mathematical Society 35, no. 4 (1929): 549–552. doi:10.1090/S0002-9904-1929-04761-X
