= Ellis Stouffer =

American mathematician (1884-1965)

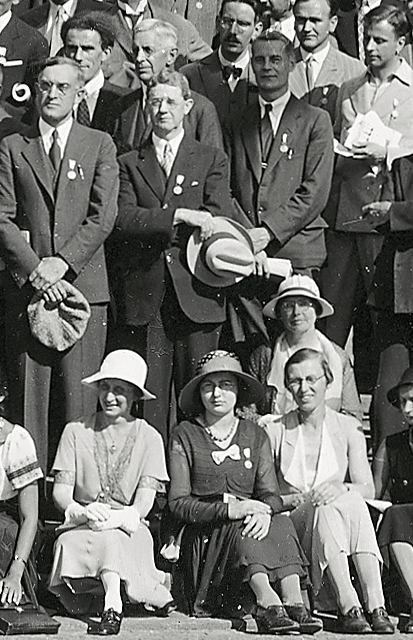
Ellis Stouffer (standing left) and Ms. Stouffer (sitting left) at the ICM 1932

Ellis Bagley Stouffer (7 November 1884, Melbourne, Iowa – 24 November 1965, Lawrence, Kansas) was an American mathematician specializing in projective differential geometry.

== Biography ==
Stouffer received bachelor's and master's degrees from Drake University in Des Moines, Iowa. In 1911 he received a Ph.D. in mathematics from the University of Illinois Urbana-Champaign under Ernest Julius Wilczynski with thesis Invariants of Linear Differential Equations, with Applications to Ruled Surfaces in Five-Dimensional Space.

Stouffer became at the University of Kansas in 1914 assistant professor, in 1917 associate professor and in 1921 full professor. In 1922 he also became dean of the Graduate School. In 1946–1951 he was dean of the University during its academic expansion program after World War II. He retired as dean in 1951 but continued teaching until 1955.

He was awarded a Guggenheim Fellowship for the academic year 1926–1927. In 1928 he was an invited speaker at the International Congress of Mathematicians in Bologna.

Upon his death he was survived by a wife and daughter. His doctoral students include Wealthy Babcock. At the University of Kansas, the E. B. Stouffer Professorship of Mathematics was established in his honor.

== Selected publications ==
- Stouffer, E. B. (November 1920). "Semivariants of a General System of Linear Homogeneous Differential Equations". Proc Natl Acad Sci U S A. 6 (11): 645–648. Bibcode:1920PNAS....6..645S. doi:10.1073/pnas.6.11.645. PMC 1084668. PMID 16576551.
- Stouffer, E. B. (September 1921). "Semi-covariants of a General System of Linear Homogeneous Differential Equations". Proc Natl Acad Sci U S A. 7 (9): 273–276. Bibcode:1921PNAS....7..273S. doi:10.1073/pnas.7.9.273. PMC 1084893. PMID 16576605.
- Stouffer, E. B. (1924). "On the independence of principal minors of determinants". Trans. Amer. Math. Soc. 26 (3): 356–368. doi:10.1090/s0002-9947-1924-1501282-2. MR 1501282.
- Stouffer, E. B. (January 1926). "A Simple Derivation of Kronecker's Relation among the Minors of a Symmetric Determinant". Proc Natl Acad Sci U S A. 12 (1): 63–64. Bibcode:1926PNAS...12...63S. doi:10.1073/pnas.12.1.63. PMC 1084400. PMID 16576961.
- Stouffer, E. B. (1927). "Singular ruled surfaces in space of five dimensions". Trans. Amer. Math. Soc. 29: 80–95. doi:10.1090/s0002-9947-1927-1501377-6. MR 1501377.
- Stouffer, E. B. (1928). "Some canonical forms and associated canonical expressions in projective differential geometry". Bull. Amer. Math. Soc. 34 (3): 290–302. doi:10.1090/s0002-9904-1928-04556-1. MR 1561552.
- with Ernest P. Lane: Stouffer, E. B.; Lane, E. P. (1928). "Recent developments in projective differential geometry". Bull. Amer. Math. Soc. 34 (4): 453–472. doi:10.1090/s0002-9904-1928-04563-9. MR 1561588.
- Stouffer, E. B. (1932). "On the contact of two space curves". Bull. Amer. Math. Soc. 38 (6): 415–419. doi:10.1090/s0002-9904-1932-05411-8. MR 1562410.
- Stouffer, E. B. (March 1932). "A Geometrical Determination of the Canonical Quadric of Wilczynski". Proc Natl Acad Sci U S A. 18 (3): 252–255. Bibcode:1932PNAS...18..252S. doi:10.1073/pnas.18.3.252. PMC 1076202. PMID 16587672.
