= Wealthy Babcock =

American mathematician (1895–1990)

Wealthy Consuelo Babcock
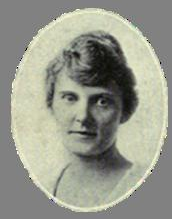
- Yearbook photo of Wealthy Babcock, University of Kansas Class of 1909
- Born: November 18, 1895; Washington County, Kansas, US
- Died: April 10, 1990 (aged 94); Lawrence, Kansas, US
- Education: University of Kansas (AB, 1919); University of Kansas (AM, 1922)
- Scientific career
- Fields: Mathematics
- Institutions: University of Kansas
- Thesis: On the Geometry Associated with Certain Determinants with Linear Elements (1926)
- Doctoral advisor: Ellis Bagley Stouffer

Wealthy Consuelo Babcock (November 11, 1895 – April 10, 1990) was an American mathematician. She was awarded a Ph.D. from the University of Kansas and had a long teaching career at that institution.

== Early life and education ==
Wealthy Consuelo Babcock was born in Washington County, Kansas, the second child of Ella Babcock (nee, Kerr) and Cassius Lincoln Babcock. She graduated in 1913 from Washington County High School and taught for two years in one-room country schools in Washington County. The following year, she matriculated at the University of Kansas where she was a member of the women's basketball team. After receiving her Bachelor of Arts in 1919, she taught for a year at Neodesha High School in southeastern Kansas. She then returned to the University of Kansas in 1920 as an instructor.

== Career at the University of Kansas ==
In addition to teaching at the university, Babcock pursued her graduate studies, earning a master's in 1922 and a doctorate with a minor in physics in 1926. Her dissertation was titled On the Geometry Associated with Certain Determinants with Linear Elements and was supervised by Ellis Bagley Stouffer. She was promoted to assistant professor in 1926 and to associate professor in 1940. She retired in 1966. During her tenure on the Kansas faculty, she regularly attended meetings of the Kansas Section of the Mathematical Association of America.

She was an outstanding teacher and for thirty years she was the mathematics department's librarian.

== Last years ==
After her retirement, Babcock was honored with the dedication of the Wealthy Babcock Mathematics Library. She served on many committees on scholarships and awards and was particularly active in the KU Alumni Association's activities, for which she received the Fred Ellsworth Medallion, the highest award for service, in 1977.

Babcock died in 1990 at ninety-four at Presbyterian Manor in Lawrence, Kansas. She was cremated and interred in the Pioneer Cemetery on the campus of the university.
