= Ernest Preston Lane =

American mathematician (1886–1969)

- Born: November 28, 1886
- Died: October 1969 (aged 82)
- Education: University of Tennessee; University of Virginia; University of Chicago (PhD)
- Occupation: Mathematician

Ernest Preston Lane (November 28, 1886, Russellville, Tennessee – October 1969) was an American mathematician, specializing in differential geometry.

== Education and career ==
In 1909, he received his bachelor's degree in from the University of Tennessee. Later in life, he went on to receive his master's degree from the University of Virginia in 1913. He taught mathematics at several academic institutions before receiving in 1918 from the University of Chicago his PhD under Ernest Julius Wilczynski with thesis Conjugate systems with indeterminate axis curves. Lane served as Instructor of Mathematics at Rice University from 1918 to 1919. At the University of Wisconsin Lane was from 1919 to 1923 an assistant professor. At the University of Chicago he was from 1923 to 1927 an assistant professor, from 1927 to 1928 an associate professor, and from 1928 to 1952 a full professor, retiring in 1952 as professor emeritus. He was the chair of the University of Chicago's mathematics department from 1941 to 1946.

Lane was a Guggenheim Fellow for the academic year 1926–1927. His doctoral students included Alice T. Schafer, Sun Guangyuan and Abba Verbeck Newton.

== Selected publications ==
- Projective differential geometry of curves and surfaces. University of Chicago Press. 1932.
- Metric differential geometry of curves and surfaces. University of Chicago Press. 1930.
- A treatise on projective differential geometry. University of Chicago Press. 1942.
