= Anna Stafford =

American mathematician

Anna Adelaide Stafford Henriques (August 20, 1905 – November 28, 2004) was an American mathematician known for her pioneering role as a female researcher at the Institute for Advanced Study.

== Education ==
Anna Adelaide Stafford was born on August 20, 1905, in Chicago, the first of five children in her family. Her father was a factory manager, and both her parents were children of immigrants. The family moved from Chicago to Wisconsin and Minnesota; her parents died in 1919 and the children moved again to a relative's home in Missouri.

Stafford graduated from high school in 1922 and, with a scholarship from the American Association of University Women, did her undergraduate studies at the Western College for Women, graduating in 1926 with a double major in Greek and mathematics and a minor in French. She became a school mathematics and science teacher in New York, Pennsylvania, and New Jersey, while attending summer classes at the University of Chicago.

Stafford completed a master's degree at Chicago in 1931, with a thesis on An Application of the Dihedral Group. She became interested in topology after seeing a talk by Raymond Louis Wilder, and became a student of Mayme Logsdon at Chicago, completing her doctorate in 1933 with a dissertation on Knotted Varieties.

== Institute of Advanced Study ==
In preparation for her postdoctoral studies, Stafford had applied to Princeton University to work with James Waddell Alexander II and Oswald Veblen, but was rejected because she was female. She then wrote directly to Veblen, who had been newly appointed to the Institute for Advanced Study (also in Princeton, New Jersey, but separate from the university), and after talking to him when he visited Chicago, she was accepted there.

Stafford became one of two women, with Mabel Schmeiser, in the first group of postdoctoral researchers to visit the Institute. She worked at the Institute from 1933 to 1935, and in order to support herself she also held a teaching position at a school in Princeton. She worked mornings at the school, freeing her afternoons to attend seminars at the Institute.

== Later life ==
After her time at the Institute, Stafford decided to aim for a career teaching mathematics rather than one as a researcher. She became an instructor at the University of Nebraska, and then in 1937 moved to the University of Utah. At Utah, her students included Tom M. Apostol, who remembered her as his "best mathematics teacher". She also served there as president of the Utah branch of the National Council of Teachers of Mathematics.

In 1942, in Salt Lake City, she married (as his second wife) Douglas Emmanuel Henriques, an administrative judge. Although Stafford and her husband had no children together, they raised Henriques' teenage son and fostered two Navajo girls.

In 1956, a change of position for Stafford's husband caused their family to move to New Mexico. She gave up what was then an associate professorship in Utah and became a lecturer at St. Michael's College in Santa Fe, New Mexico, and soon after also at the University of New Mexico. She became a full professor at St. Michael's in 1962, and gave up her second position at the University of New Mexico. She eventually became department chair at St. Michael's (later the Santa Fe University of Art and Design), and retired as chair emeritus in 1971.

Stafford and her husband lived in their retirement in Falls Church, Virginia. Her husband died in 1987, and she died on November 28, 2004, in Bailey's Crossroads, Virginia.
