= The Higher Infinite =

1994 mathematics book

The Higher Infinite: Large Cardinals in Set Theory from their Beginnings
- Author: Akihiro Kanamori
- Language: English
- Series: Perspectives in Mathematical Logic
- Genre: Mathematics
- Publisher: Springer-Verlag
- Publication date: 1994

The Higher Infinite: Large Cardinals in Set Theory from their Beginnings is a monograph in set theory by Akihiro Kanamori, concerning the history and theory of large cardinals, infinite sets characterized by such strong properties that their existence cannot be proven in Zermelo–Fraenkel set theory (ZFC). This book was published in 1994 by Springer-Verlag in their series Perspectives in Mathematical Logic, with a second edition in 2003 in their Springer Monographs in Mathematics series, and a paperback reprint of the second edition in 2009 (ISBN 978-3-540-88866-6).

== Topics ==
Not counting introductory material and appendices, there are six chapters in The Higher Infinite, arranged roughly in chronological order by the history of the development of the subject. The author writes that he chose this ordering "both because it provides the most coherent exposition of the mathematics and because it holds the key to any epistemological concerns".

In the first chapter, "Beginnings", the material includes inaccessible cardinals, Mahlo cardinals, measurable cardinals, compact cardinals and indescribable cardinals. The chapter covers the constructible universe and inner models, elementary embeddings and ultrapowers, and a result of Dana Scott that measurable cardinals are inconsistent with the axiom of constructibility.

The second chapter, "Partition properties", includes the partition calculus of Paul Erdős and Richard Rado, trees and Aronszajn trees, the model-theoretic study of large cardinals, and the existence of the set 0^{#} of true formulae about indiscernibles. It also includes Jónsson cardinals and Rowbottom cardinals.

Next are two chapters on "Forcing and sets of reals" and "Aspects of measurability". The main topic of the first of these chapters is forcing, a technique introduced by Paul Cohen for proving consistency and inconsistency results in set theory; it also includes material in descriptive set theory. The second of these chapters covers the application of forcing by Robert M. Solovay to prove the consistency of measurable cardinals, and related results using stronger notions of forcing.

Chapter five is "Strong hypotheses". It includes material on supercompact cardinals and their reflection properties, on huge cardinals, on Vopěnka's principle, on extendible cardinals, on strong cardinals, and on Woodin cardinals. The book concludes with the chapter "Determinacy", involving the axiom of determinacy and the theory of infinite games. Reviewer Frank R. Drake views this chapter, and the proof in it by Donald A. Martin of the Borel determinacy theorem, as central for Kanamori, "a triumph for the theory he presents".

Although quotations expressing the philosophical positions of researchers in this area appear throughout the book, more detailed coverage of issues in the philosophy of mathematics regarding the foundations of mathematics are deferred to an appendix.

== Audience and reception ==
Reviewer Pierre Matet writes that this book "will no doubt serve for many years to come as the main reference for large cardinals", and reviewers Joel David Hamkins, Azriel Lévy and Philip Welch express similar sentiments. Hamkins writes that the book is "full of historical insight, clear writing, interesting theorems, and elegant proofs". Because this topic uses many of the important tools of set theory more generally, Lévy recommends the book "to anybody who wants to start doing research in set theory", and Welch recommends it to all university libraries.
