= Frank J. Ayres =

Mathematics professor and author

- Born: 10 December 1901
- Died: June 1994 (aged 92)
- Education: Washington College; University of Chicago
- Occupation: Professor of Mathematics

Frank Ayres, Jr. (/ɛərz/; 10 December 1901, Rock Hall, Maryland – June 1994) was a mathematics professor, best known as an author for the popular Schaum's Outlines.

== Biography ==
Ayres earned his Bachelor of Science degree from Washington College, Maryland and his master's and doctoral degrees from the University of Chicago. He taught during 1921–4 at Ogden College and another four years at Texas A&M before coming to Dickinson College in 1928. He was promoted to associate professor in June, 1935. In 1943 he was named the Susan Powers Hoffman Professor of Mathematics. From 1938 until his retirement in June, 1958, he served as chairman of the mathematics department. Ayres was also an instructor in the Army Air Corps program at the college, 1943–44, and authored Basic Mathematics of Aviation, which was adopted across the Air Corps training system. In all, he wrote seven textbooks. Along with his teaching, he also served as assistant registrar and registrar between 1941 and 1945.

== Bibliography ==
- Basic Mathematics for Aviation (1943)
- Schaum's Outline Series:
  - First Year College Mathematics
  - Trigonometry
  - Differentrial and Integral Calculus, 1950 and 1964 editions. With Elliott Mendelson from 3rd edition
  - Differential Equations (1952)
  - Modern Algebra (1965)
  - Abstract Algebra (2nd edition of Modern Algebra with Lloyd R. Jaisingh)
  - College Mathematics, with Philip Schmidt
  - Differential and Integral Calculus; in Si Metric Units, J.C. Ault (Adapter)
  - Mathematics of Finance
  - Matrices
  - Plane and Spherical Trigonometry
  - Projective Geometry
  - Trigonometry, with Robert E. Moyer

== External links and references ==
- Frank J. Ayres, Jr. (1901–1994), archives.dickinson.edu
- Frank Ayres, Jr. at the Mathematics Genealogy Project
