= Akihiro Kanamori =

Japanese-born American mathematician

- 金森 晶洋
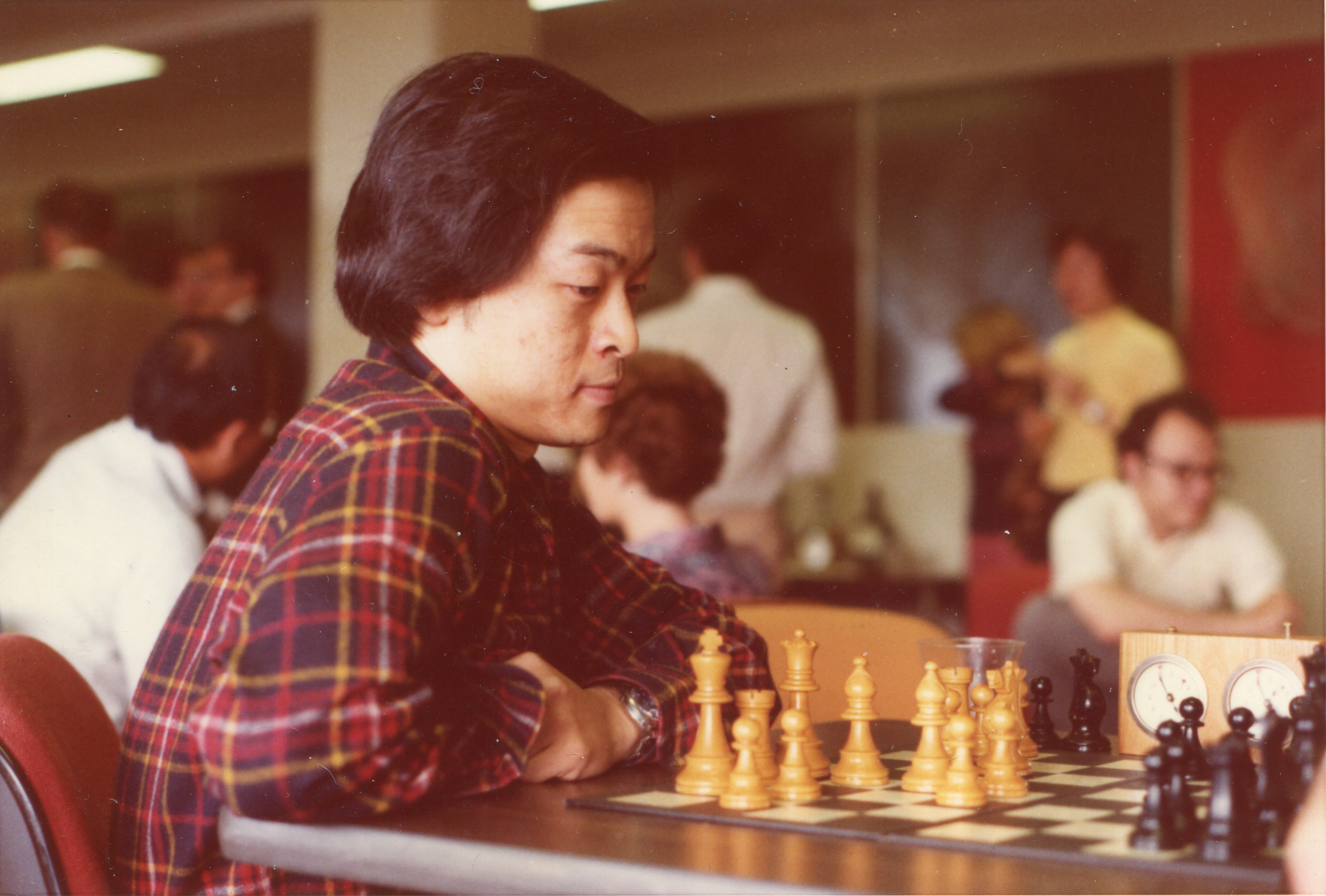
- Kanamori playing chess in 1975
- Born: October 23, 1948 (age 77); Tokyo, Japan
- Education: California Institute of Technology, University of Cambridge
- Known for: The Higher Infinite
- Spouse: Tamara Awerbuch-Friedlander (until divorce)
- Children: 2 sons
- Scientific career
- Fields: Mathematics
- Workplaces: Boston University
- Thesis: Ultrafilters over uncountable cardinals (1975)
- Doctoral advisor: Adrian Mathias
- Doctoral students: Marcia Groszek

Akihiro Kanamori (金森 晶洋, Kanamori Akihiro; born October 23, 1948 in Tokyo) is a Japanese-born American mathematician. He specializes in set theory and is the author of the monograph on large cardinals, The Higher Infinite. He has written several essays on the history of mathematics, especially set theory.

Kanamori graduated from California Institute of Technology and earned a Ph.D. from the University of Cambridge (King's College), and is a professor of mathematics at Boston University.

With Matthew Foreman, Kanamori is the editor of the Handbook of Set Theory (2010).

== Selected publications ==
- A. Kanamori, M. Magidor: The evolution of large cardinal axioms in set theory, in: Higher set theory (Proc. Conf., Math. Forschungsinst., Oberwolfach, 1977), Lecture Notes in Mathematics, 669, Springer, 99–275.
- R. M. Solovay, W. N. Reinhardt, A. Kanamori: Strong axioms of infinity and elementary embeddings, Annals of Mathematical Logic, 13(1978), 73–116.
- A. Kanamori: The Higher Infinite. Large Cardinals in Set Theory from their Beginnings., Perspectives in Mathematical Logic. Springer-Verlag, Berlin, 1994. xxiv+536 pp.

=== Honors ===
- Marshall Scholarship
