= Ground axiom =

Set theory

In set theory, the ground axiom states that the universe of set theory is not a nontrivial set-forcing extension of an inner model. The axiom was introduced by Hamkins (2005) and Reitz (2007).
