= Ernest Julius Wilczynski =

American mathematician

Ernest Julius Wilczynski (November 13, 1876 – September 14, 1932) was an American mathematician considered the founder of projective differential geometry.

Born in Hamburg, Germany, Wilczynski's family emigrated to America and settled in Chicago, Illinois when he was very young. He attended public school in the US but went to college in Germany and received his PhD from the University of Berlin in 1897. He taught at the University of California, Berkeley until 1907, the University of Illinois from 1907 to 1910, and the University of Chicago from 1910 until illness forced his absence from the classroom in 1923. His doctoral students include Archibald Henderson, Ernest Preston Lane, Pauline Sperry, Ellis Stouffer, and Charles Thompson Sullivan.

== Selected publications ==
- Projective differential geometry of curves and ruled surfaces, Leipzig, Teubner 1906
- Projective differential geometry of curved surfaces, Parts I–V, Transactions American Mathematical Society
  - vol. 8, 1907, Part I, pp. 223–260
  - vol. 9, 1908, Part II, pp. 79–120 doi:10.1090/S0002-9947-1908-1500804-6; Part III, pp. 293–315 doi:10.1090/S0002-9947-1908-1500815-0
  - vol. 10, 1909, Part IV, pp. 176–200 doi:10.1090/S0002-9947-1909-1500833-3; Part V, pp. 279–296 doi:10.1090/S0002-9947-1909-1500839-4
