= Multiverse (set theory) =

Perspective of mathematical philosophy

In mathematical set theory, the multiverse view is that there are many models of set theory, but no "absolute", "canonical" or "true" model. The various models are all equally valid or true, though some may be more useful or attractive than others. The opposite view is the "universe" view of set theory in which all sets are contained in some single ultimate model.

The collection of countable transitive models of ZFC (in some universe) is called the hyperverse and is very similar to the "multiverse".

A typical difference between the universe and multiverse views is the attitude to the continuum hypothesis. In the universe view the continuum hypothesis is a meaningful question that is either true or false though we have not yet been able to decide which. In the multiverse view it is meaningless to ask whether the continuum hypothesis is true or false before selecting a model of set theory. Another difference is that the statement "For every transitive model of ZFC there is a larger model of ZFC in which it is countable" is true in some versions of the multiverse view of mathematics but is false in the universe view.
