= Elliott Mendelson =

American logician (1931–2020)

- Born: May 24, 1931
- Died: May 7, 2020 (aged 88)
- Education: Columbia University (BA); Cornell University (PhD)
- Occupation: Professor of Mathematics
- Employer: Queens College, City University of New York
- Scientific career
- Thesis: The Independence of the Axiom of Choice (1955)
- Doctoral advisor: J. Barkley Rosser

Elliott Mendelson (May 24, 1931 – May 7, 2020) was an American logician. He was a professor of mathematics at Queens College of the City University of New York, and the Graduate Center, CUNY. He was Jr. Fellow, Society of Fellows, Harvard University, 1956–58.

== Career ==
Mendelson earned his BA from Columbia University and PhD from Cornell University.

Mendelson taught mathematics at the college level for more than 30 years, and is the author of books on logic, philosophy of mathematics, calculus, game theory and mathematical analysis.

His Introduction to Mathematical Logic, first published in 1964, was reviewed by Dirk van Dalen who noted that it included "a large variety of subjects that should be part of the education of any mathematics student with an interest in foundational matters."

== Books ==
=== Sole author ===
- Mendelson, Elliot (1970). Schaum's Outline of Boolean Algebra and Switching Circuits (paperback). Schaum's Outlines. New York: McGraw-Hill. ISBN 0-07-041460-2.
- — (1988). 3000 Solved Problems in Calculus (paperback). Schaum's Solved Problems Series. New York: McGraw-Hill (published 2009). ISBN 0-07-163534-3.
- — (2004). Introducing Game Theory and its Applications (hardcover). Discrete Mathematics and Its Applications. Boca Raton: Chapman and Hall/CRC. ISBN 1-58488-300-6.
- — (2008) [1973]. Number Systems and the Foundations of Analysis (paperback, reprint). New York: Dover. ISBN 978-0-486-45792-5.
- — (2008). Schaum's Outline of Beginning Calculus (paperback). Schaum's Outlines (3rd ed.). New York: McGraw-Hill (published 2009). ISBN 978-0-07-163535-6.
- — (2012). McGraw-Hill's 500 College Calculus Questions to Know by Test Day (paperback). McGraw-Hill's 500 College Questions to Know by Test Day. New York: McGraw-Hill. ISBN 978-0-07-178963-9.
- — (2015). Introduction to Mathematical Logic (hardcover). Textbooks in Mathematics (6th ed.). Boca Raton: CRC Press/Taylor & Francis Group (A Chapman & Hall Book). ISBN 978-1-4822-3772-6.

=== Co-author ===
- Mendelson, Elliot; Frank Ayres, Jr. (1990). Schaum's Outline of Theory and Problems of Differential and Integral Calculus (paperback). Schaum's Outlines (3rd ed.). New York: McGraw-Hill. ISBN 0-07-002662-9.
- —; Frank Ayres, Jr (1999). Schaum's Outline of Calculus (paperback). Schaum's Outlines (5th ed.). New York: McGraw-Hill. ISBN 0-07-150861-9.
- —; Frank Ayres, Jr (2010). Schaum's Easy Outline of Calculus (paperback). Schaum's Easy Outlines (2nd ed.). New York: McGraw-Hill. ISBN 978-0-07-174582-6.
- —; Frances R. Curcio (2012). Schaum's Outline of Mathematics for Elementary School Teachers (paperback). Schaum's Outlines. New York: McGraw-Hill. ISBN 978-0-07-160047-7.

=== Editor ===
- Leblanc, Hugues; Mendelson, Elliot; Orenstein, Alex, eds. (2010). Foundations: Logic, Language, and Mathematics (paperback). City College Studies in the History and Philosophy of Science and Technology. Dordrecht, Holland: D. Reidel. ISBN 978-90-481-8406-4.

== Journal articles ==
- P. C. Gilmore, Donald A. Martin & Elliott Mendelson (1975). Meeting of the Association for Symbolic Logic. Journal of Symbolic Logic 40 (2):299-304.
- Hugues Leblanc, Elliott Mendelson & Alex Orenstein (1984). Preface. Synthese 60 (1).
- Elliott Mendelson (2005). Book Review: Igor Lavrov, Larisa Maksimova, Problems in Set Theory, Mathematical Logic and the Theory of Algorithms, Edited by Giovanna Corsi, Kluwer Academic / Plenum Publishers, 2003, Us$141.00, Pp. XII + 282, ISBN 0-306-47712-2, Hardbound. Studia Logica 79 (3).
- Elliott Mendelson (2000). Critical Studies/Book Reviews. Philosophia Mathematica 8 (3).
- Elliott Mendelson (2007). Graham Oppy. Philosophical Perspectives on Infinity. Philosophia Mathematica 15 (3).
- Elliott Mendelson (1956) "Some Proofs of Independence in Axiomatic Set Theory", Journal of Symbolic Logic 21(3): 291–303.
- Elliott Mendelson (1990) "Second Thoughts About Church's Thesis and Mathematical Proofs", Journal of Philosophy 87(5): 225–233.
- Elliott Mendelson (1956) "The Independence of a Weak Axiom of Choice", Journal of Symbolic Logic 21(4): 350–366.
- Sidney Morgenbesser & Elliott Mendelson (1966) "Annual Meeting of the Association for Symbolic Logic", Journal of Symbolic Logic 31(4):682-696.
