= Souleymane Bachir Diagne =

Senegalese philosopher

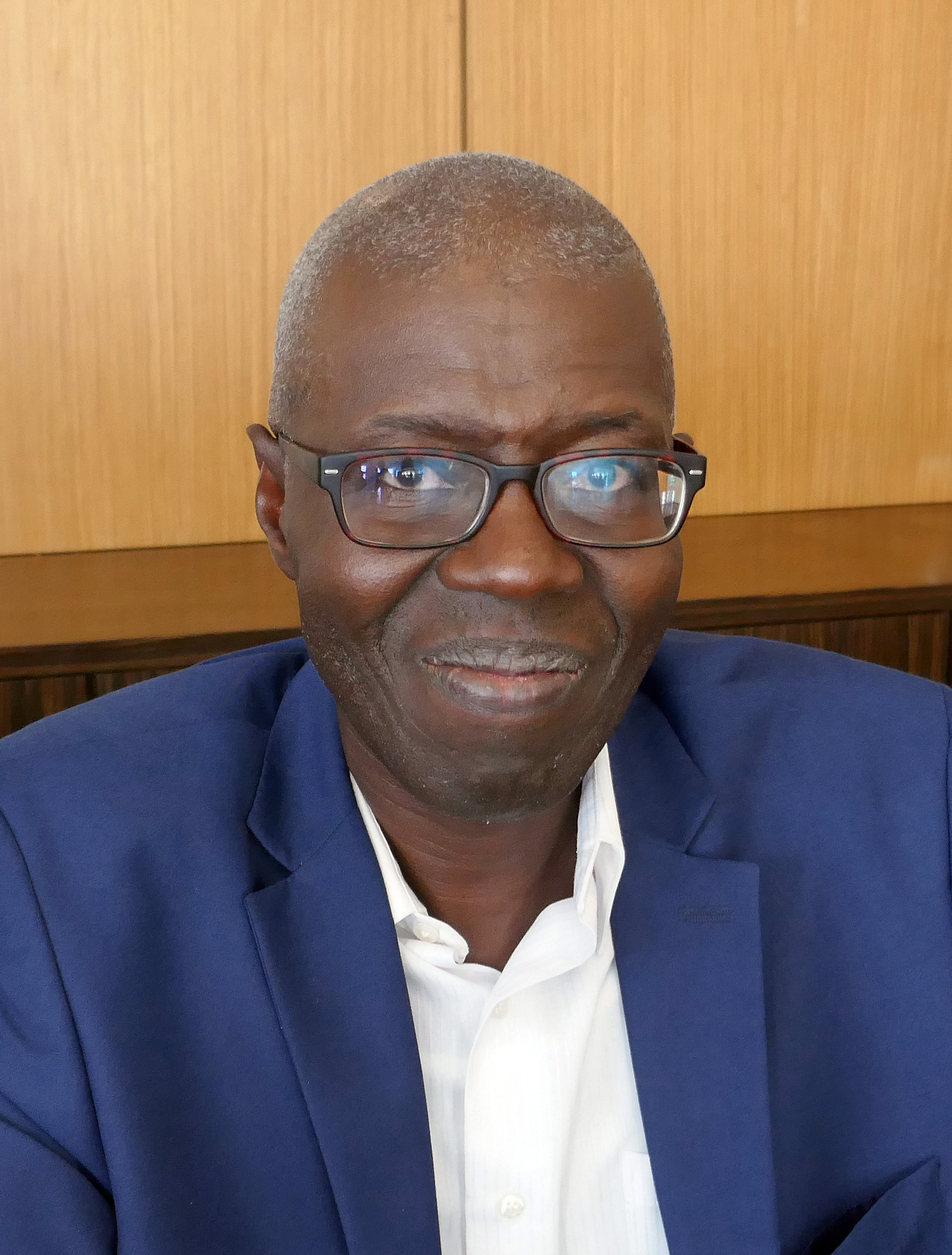
- Born: 1955 (age 70–71); Saint-Louis, Senegal

Education
- Education: Sorbonne, École Normale Supérieure

Philosophical work
- Era: 21st-century philosophy
- Region: Western philosophy, African philosophy
- Main interests: Philosophy of mathematics, Epistemology, Logic, Linguistics, Mathematics, Islamic philosophy

Souleymane Bachir Diagne French: [djaɲ] (born 8 November 1955 in Saint-Louis, Senegal) is a Senegalese philosopher. His work is focused on the history of logic and mathematics, epistemology, the tradition of philosophy in the Islamic world, identity formation, and African literatures and philosophies.

== Education ==
After passing his baccalauréat in Senegal, Diagne was admitted to the demanding public secondary school Lycée Louis-le-Grand in Paris, following in the footsteps, almost a half-century later, of his compatriot and the first president of Senegal, Léopold Sédar Senghor. There he prepared for the entrance exams to the École Normale Supérieure, meanwhile receiving his license and maîtrise level degrees in philosophy at the Université Paris 1 Panthéon-Sorbonne. At the École Normale Supérieure he studied with Althusser and Derrida. After receiving his agrégation in Philosophy (1978), Diagne spent a year at Harvard University in an exchange program. In 1982 he defended a doctoral thesis in mathematics at Université Paris I, where, in 1988, he also completed his doctorat d’Etat, under the direction of Jean-Toussaint Desanti, on George Boole’s algebra of logic.

== Career ==
In 1982, Diagne returned to his native country to teach philosophy at Cheikh Anta Diop University in Dakar, where he became vice-dean of the College of Humanities. The former president of the Republic of Senegal, Abdou Diouf, named him Counselor for Education and Culture, a position which he held from 1993 to 1999.

Having taught for several years in the departments of Philosophy and Religion at Northwestern University (2002 to 2007), Diagne is currently Professor of French, and former Chair of the Department of French and Romance Philology with a secondary appointment in the Department of Philosophy, at Columbia University in New York. He is director of the Institute of African Studies.

Diagne is co-director of Éthiopiques, a Senegalese journal of literature and philosophy, and a member of the editorial committees of numerous scholarly journals, including the Revue d’histoire des mathématiques, Présence africaine, and Public Culture. He is a member of the scientific committees of Diogenes (published by UNESCO’s International Council for Philosophy and Human Sciences), CODESRIA (Conseil pour le développement de la recherche en sciences sociales en Afrique), and of the African and Malagasy Committee for Higher Education (CAMES), as well as UNESCO's Council on the Future. He has been named by Le Nouvel observateur one of the 50 thinkers of our time. In October 2007, he was invited to participate in a white paper commission on the defense and national security in the French Senate in Paris.

In April 2025, Souleymane Bachir Diagne ended his career as a teacher-researcher, after more than fifteen years of career, at Columbia University, in New York, United States.

== Awards and recognition ==
Diagne was awarded the Prix de la Principauté on 8 October 2024. This award is granted jointly by Les Rencontres Philosophiques de Monaco and the Prince Pierre Foundation for the recipient's lifetime achievement and entire body of work.

== Work ==
His main publications include two books on George Boole, a book on the Pakistani poet-philosopher Muhammad Iqbal, Islam et société ouverte. La fidélité et le mouvement dans la pensée de Muhammad Iqbal (2001) and an examination of Senghor's philosophy, Léopold Sédar Senghor. L’Art africain comme philosophie (2007). He published a book on Islam and philosophy: Comment philosopher en Islam in 2010.

== Bibliography ==
=== Books (In English) ===
- Open to Reason: Muslim Philosophers in Conversation with the Western Tradition, Translated by Jonathan Adjemian, Columbia University Press (2018).
- The Ink of the Scholars: Reflections on Philosophy in Africa (2016).
- African Art as Philosophy: Senghor, Bergson, and the Idea of Negritude, Translated by Chike Jeffers, (2011).

=== Books (In French) ===
- Le fagot de ma mémoire (2021)
- Comment philosopher en Islam (2010)
- Léopold Sédar Senghor: l’art africain comme philosophie. Paris: Riveneuve Editions, 2007.
- 100 mots pour dire l’islam. Paris: Maisonneuve et Larose, 2002.
- Islam et société ouverte, la fidélité et le mouvement dans la pensée de Muhammad Iqbal. Paris : Maisonneuve & Larose, 2001.
- Logique pour philosophes. Dakar: Nouvelles Editions Africaines du Sénégal, 1991 .
- Boole, l’oiseau de nuit en plein jour. Paris: Belin, 1989.

=== Articles ===
- "Édouard Glissant : l’infinie passion de tramer", Littérature, n° 174, p. 88-91.
- "On the Postcolonial and the Universal?", Rue Descartes, n° 78, p. 7-18.
- "Philosopher en Afrique", Critique, n° 771–772, p. 611-612.
- "Breathless...", Philosophy World Democracy.
- "Individual, Community, and human Rights, a lesson from Kwasi Wiredu’s philosophy of personhood", Transition, an international Review, No. 101, pp. 8–15.

=== Interviews ===
- A conversation with Professor Souleymane Diagne on achieving our humanity together, by Karen Lee, United Nations archive and library.

=== Video ===
- “The Philosopher as Translator”, Cornell University.
