= Croatian historiography =

Croatian historiography refers to the methodology of history studies developed and applied by Croatian historians.

== Origins and development up to the early 20th century ==
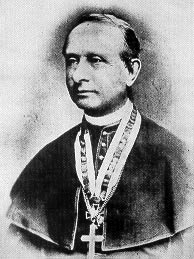
Franjo Rački was the main figure in the development of modern Croatian historiography.

Fifteenth- and sixteenth-century South Slavic humanists intellectuals, particularly those near the Adriatic coast, helped establish and cultivate a Croatian past through their writings, although few of them engaged in scholarly historical writing. In 1532, Vinko Pribojević wrote De origine successibusque Slavorum (On the Origin and Events of the Slavs), which, despite its inaccuracies and occasional fabrications, was the first source-based survey of the history of Dalmatia from early to modern times. The first modern Croatian historical work based on critical scholarly research was written by Johannes Lucius (Croatian: Ivan Lučić) in 1666 and entitled De regno Dalmatiae et Croatiae (On the realm of Dalmatia and Croatia). Lučić is the first Croatian historian to critically approach and use sources, documents and chronicles, inscriptions and testaments and is sometimes referred to as the "father of Croatian historiography".

In the sixteenth century, history as a science emerged in Croatian politics. In the first half of the nineteenth century, it was used as the basis for a national revival. During this period, few Croatian historians disengaged from romanticism and patriotism. Infused with politics, this older historiography formed hypotheses which have since been rejected or drastically amended by newer historiography.

In the nineteenth century, politicians used history to advance their views. For example, the Anti-Habsburg politician and writer Ante Starčević portrayed men who were generally considered Croatian national heroes such as Nikola IV Zrinski and Josip Jelačić as symbols of submission to Austrian rule, while propagating Petar Zrinski and Fran Krsto Frankopan, who were executed by Vienna for conspiracy to overthrow the Kingdom. Conversely, the Roman Catholic priest Josip Juraj Strossmayer advanced the idea of Orthodox-Catholic and Yugoslav unification in the second half of the nineteenth century, using the missionary brothers Cyril and Methodius as his basis.

Modern Croatian historiography has its roots in the second half of the 19th century, coinciding with the rise of nationalism in Europe. The main figure in the development of modern Croatian historiography was Franjo Rački, an associate of Strossmayer, who published a collection of medieval sources. His primary source collection Documenta historiae Chroaticae periodum antiquam illustrantia developed a structure for the chronicle of early Croatian history, as part of a larger narrative tracing the joint history of South Slavs. Rački had a profound impact in the future historiography of early medieval Croats as he provided an ideologically consistent historical narrative for the South Slavic peoples.

Tadija Smičiklas published the first work on Croatian history in two volumes (1879–1882), which along with his other works, laid the foundation for Croatian scholarly historiography as well as contributing to the strengthening of the idea of continuity of Croatian statehood and independence. Later, Ferdo Šišić published a three-volume set Hrvatska povijest (History of Croatia) from 1906 to 1913. Šišić incorporated Rački's ideas in History of the Croats in the Age of Croat rulers (1925) which provided the groundwork for subsequent historiography and became "reified scholarly knowledge for generations to come".

During the establishment of the first Yugoslavia in 1918, some Croatian-centric historians expressed their opposition with unification with Serbia, saying it was contradictory to the thousand year development of a self-reliant Croatian state. Yugoslav historians argued the unification as a natural path for Serbs and Croats, pointing to historical examples of association.

== During the Socialist Federal Republic of Yugoslavia (1945–1990) ==
Historiography in the initial post-war period in the communist-led Yugoslavia was driven by socialist ideology and Marxist interpretations. The extent of the new government's reach however only extended to the period of the mid-nineteenth century and beyond. Historians were expected to abide by these constraints when dealing with the history of the labour movement, communism and World War Two. However, the research and methodology of medieval, early modern and parts of the nineteenth century history were largely uninfluenced.

A major component of the Socialist Federal Republic of Yugoslavia's foundation laid in the concept of the anti-fascist struggle and "brotherhood and unity". Accordingly, no particular Yugoslav group was assigned guilt for mass murder and collaboration during World War II and each Yugoslav republic shared equal responsibility. These narratives shifted during the 1960s as Yugoslav historiography transitioned into debates between Serbian and Croatian historians regarding each respective ethnic group's role in the war. Starting in this period, Croatian historiography was marked by two emerging and conflicting trends. On one hand, serious and distinguished historians, including medievalists, who were oriented with Western approaches to historiography and on the other, nationalist historians of the contemporary period who squabbled with their Serbian counterparts.

The growing nationalist sphere was represented by historian and future Croatian President Franjo Tudjman and became supreme following Croatia's independence in 1991. Tudjman had challenged the inflated casualties of the Jasenovac concentration camp which had been claimed to be 700,000 by Serbian historians, though he wound up providing figures that were too low. He emphasized the Serbian Chetniks' collaboration with the Axis while leaving out the Ustaše, stressed the role of Croatian Partisans while diminishing the role of Serbian Partisans, and defended the Domobrani claiming they had been forced to fight the Partisans. Nonetheless, history textbooks during the 1960s still reflected the unitary Yugoslav perspective, though with the process of federalization in the 1970s their content became more diverse.

In the 1950s and 1960s contacts with international scholars were opened, allowing for different tools in the exploration of history. In the 1970s, historian Mirjana Gross spread the Annales school methodology and popularized an approach that combined "non-dogmatic Marxism and Braudelian understanding of time and structure". Additionally, research into social history, history of mentalities and microhistory began to grow, especially among medieval and early modern historians who had previously focused merely on political history. During the 1980s, research into social history was expanded and supplemented by cultural history, influenced by the Bielefeld School approach of German social historians such as Hans-Ulrich Wehler, Lothar Gall and Jürgen Kocka. Women's history was mostly expressed in the works of Lydia Sklevicky, who was well acquainted with Western feminist literature, but was especially inspired by the work of Natalie Zemon Davis.

== Post-communist Croatian historiography (1990s) ==
The rule of Tudjman and his Croatian Democratic Union in the 1990s ushered in an era of historical revisionism with a great deal of professional Croatian historians participating in its formulation. Media came under Tudjman and the HDZ's control, and the few independent newspapers and weekly magazines were repressed and marginalized. At the University of Zagreb, a new Faculty of Croatian Studies was created and within it, a rival Department of History to counter the Faculty of Philosophy and Faculty of Political Science which tried to distance themselves from nationalist revisions of history. Historians were expected to be the promoters of the new national awareness and statehood amidst a societal climate of national enthusiasm and euphoria. Historiography was tasked with demonstrating how the Croatian nation and statehood was firmly and deeply rooted in the past. While a minority of Croatian historians succumbed to the national euphoria, most of them remained professional and were instead largely affected through the fact the research work was largely focused on national history.

Research focused on the nation state as the primary unit of scholarly analysis, resulting in studies being written from a Croatian centered perspective and an absence of studies on regional, European, or global history. Studies conducted in the 1990s focused on "grand narratives" of Croatian history relating to national and state identity, such as the ethnogenesis of the Croats, the formation of Croatian territory and borders over time, the role of the Catholic Church or the publication of core sources of Croatian history. Old myths and stereotypes reappeared in some historians' work, like the "thousand-year-old continuity of Croatian statehood" or Croatia as "Antemurale Christianitatis" during the Ottoman conquest. Negative stereotypes about other nations were prevalent, most obvious and harmful in school books.

The official political discourse was strongly centralist. Slavonia was referred to as "Eastern Croatia", and Dalmatia as "Southern Croatia", with a misunderstanding and disparagement of Istrian regional specificity. Croatism was often combined with attempts to identify Croatia and Catholicism and to assimilate Bosnia and Herzegovina as Croatian. After the breakup of Yugoslavia, Balkanophobia was prevalent in an attempt to avoid linking Croatia with a concept that was understood exclusively negatively. The escape from the Balkans was connected with emphasizing Croatia's integration into Western European civilization, and, related to the 19th century, highlighting the Central European dimension.

With the Annales school's growing influence, interest in historical anthropology rose as well as the development of demographic methodology. Mirjana Gross published seminal works on social development in the nineteenth century and in 1996 published Suvremena historiografija: korijeni, postignuća, traganja an influential book on contemporary historiography.

== 21st century ==
With the formation of a new coalition led by the Social Democratic Party of Croatia in 2000, prospects for Croatian historiography began to change. The profession diversified, and became more polycentric, allowing more field studies to take shape. Environmental studies emerged and Memory studies in particular have increased in popularity while historians have increasingly employed interdisciplinary approaches, from historical anthropology, demography, literary theory and imagology.

Research into the early modern period and, to a lesser extent, the Middle Ages, has produced more thematic and methodological innovations than research into modern and contemporary history. In 2001, research into the Croatian War of Independence, known in Croatia as the Homeland War, began within the Croatian Institute of History as a result of a government decision. In 2004, the Institute established the Croatian Memorial Documentation Centre of the Homeland War. Concerns regarding objectivity and the relationship between historians and politics emerged when the lead investigator of the project was entrusted after two other historians declined due to the "sensitivity and politicization of the topic". Legitimate debate between historians advocating for a uniformed narrative and those for critical and alternative perspectives about the war have only arisen in school curriculum and history textbooks however.

== Themes and positions ==
=== 19th century ===
Most of the historiographical production about the 19th century discusses the period from 1848 onward, given that it was the period of the formation of modern Croatian civil society. During the communist era, historiography emphasized the 1848 revolution as a progressive movement that rejected feudalism. After Croatian independence, its national component was also emphasized. Regarding the 19th century, Croatian statehood is emphasized, with Ante Starčević being seen as the founder of the nation due to his consistent support for an independent Croatia. Apart from Starčević, Stjepan Radić is considered one of the most meritorious Croats, along with conservative church dignitaries such as Juraj Haulik, Josip Stadler and Alojzij Stepinac. Radić is considered to be the key bearer of Croatia, to whom numerous works are dedicated that show his political activities and ideology, but also deal with his schooling or his pedagogical views. Although serious works do not deny his adherence first to the Habsburg and then to the Yugoslav state framework, the Croatian component is the foreground. In Croatian historiography, the presentation of non-Croatian peoples is often simplified and even negative. Stereotypes persist about Hungarians as oppressors of Croatia, especially for the post-dualistic period. Research on unionism (a political option for the unconditional union of Hungary and Croatia) and especially its liberal determinants have been neglected, and Károly Khuen-Héderváry is given a rather simplified assessment as the source of all evil for Croatia.

=== World War One ===
Historiography on World War I during the Kingdom of Yugoslavia (1918–1941) focused on the creation of the state after the war and its justification. The Austro-Hungarian monarchy was referred to as a "prison of nations" and pro-Yugoslav and anti-Habsburg Croats were emphasized with particular attention paid to the Yugoslav Committee. During the socialist era (1945–1990), anti-imperialism was the prevailing narrative and participation of Croats in the Austro-Hungarian army was overlooked. However, works published after 1991 paid significant attention to prominent pro-Habsburg oriented individuals, military commanders in the Austro-Hungarian army and Croatian units, although local and regional micro-histories was the focus. Still, research into the topic has been minimal. In Croatian textbooks, Serbia is blamed for the outbreak of the war.

=== World War Two ===
In an attempt to reconcile former Croatian Partisans and Ustaše members, Tudjman reassessed the legacy of the Ustaše as an embodiment of Croats' desire for statehood and declared the Independent State of Croatia (NDH) an "expression of the political desires of the Croat nation for its own independent state". Thus, both the Partisans and Ustaše played a role for the "Croatian cause" in their own ways. The former declaration was a main catalyst for the subsequent positive reframing of the NDH that would become prevalent in WWII historiography beginning in the 1990s. Jasenovac was often referred to as a "labour camp" where mass murder did not take place. This phenomenon was concurrent with studies that attempted to figure out more precise data on the number of losses in the NDH.

The perspectives of post WWII Croat emigres from the new communist government about the Second World War differed from the prevailing narrative of anti-fascism. They adopted several myths of which the central theme was that it was fought by "Great Serbian ideology", whether through the Partisans or the Chetniks, against the Croat nation and the NDH. The tactics employed by NDH authorities were therefore presented as legitimate acts of self-defense. Ustaše atrocities were minimized, while conversely the Bleiburg repatriations were identified with Croat suffering and mythologized with claims that hundreds of thousands of civilians had been killed by Josip Broz Tito's forces. During communist rule, Bleiburg was a taboo topic but after Yugoslavia's disintegration, research into it along with human losses during WWII in general became prominent. The political crisis in Yugoslavia that began in 1990–1991 allowed the views of these Croat writers abroad to become transplanted into Croatia and current experiences were aligned with revisionist interpretations of the NDH as a struggle against Greater Serbia. Jasenovac was longer mentioned in Croatian school textbooks, replaced with tales of Bleiburg and the communist death marches. Bleiburg and the crimes committed by Chetniks were extensively described and illustrated with gruesome pictures but atrocities of the NDH regime were hardly mentioned at all.

Starting in the early 2000s, partly as a response to the historical revisionism of the 1990s, there has been an increase in research on the Holocaust and Porajmos though significantly less regarding the mass murder of Serbs. New perspectives on the history of the NDH emerged primarily as a result of comparative fascism research conducted by expatriate historians. The Croatian Institute of History has formed several projects investigating the number of human losses in Croatia during WWII, focusing on the Yugoslav communist regime's atrocities against NDH soldiers and ethnic Germans following the war.

=== Croatian War of Independence and Croat-Serb relations ===
It was only after 1991 and the Croatian War of Independence that Croatian historians became focused on Serbian history. Prior to 1991, communism and Josip Broz Tito was the main preoccupation among the nationalist sector. Croatian-Serbian relations were re-contextualized within the framework of recent developments and Serbian history was represented through the prism of expansion and repression. Croats were portrayed as victims and Serbian nationalism and the concept of Greater Serbia was equaled to genocide, echoing the analyses of Serbian historians who also linked Croatian nationalism in the same manner. The new Croatian historiography portrayed Serbia as a warlike nation whose heads of states were planning to commit genocide against their neighbors as early as the 1840s. Through analyses of 19th century documents and historical events up to the 20th century, Serbs were presented as "bloody, treacherous, cold, calculating, ruthless, greedy, and expansionist" and the war was explained as a result of a long continuous pattern of Serbian behavior. The Serbian Orthodox Church is portrayed as a major catalyst for such chauvinism. A scholarly symposium backed by the Catholic Church in Croatia declared Serbs and the Serbian clergy as the instigators of the war, describing it as a genocide against Croats. Studies appeared which argued that Serbs began genocide against Croats during the Bleiburg repatriations under communism, continued with the State Security Service (UDBA) and attempted to end it with the war of 1991–95.

Greater Serbia is also a recurring theme in Croatian textbooks, from the 19th century up until the Croatian War of Independence. Some Croatian historians also portrayed Serbian-Croatian antagonism through the Great Schism of 1054 which divided Catholics and Orthodox Christians. Croats were thus presented as Western and more civilized and Serbs as Eastern and inferior, the two peoples being incompatible together.

In recent times however, there has also been a noticeable interest in the ideology and political activity of Serbs in Croatia, where the social and cultural context of the history of Serbs in Croatia is increasingly explored.

=== Istria ===
Croatian historiography as well as ethnography have tried for decades to minimize the multi-ethnic character of Istria throughout history.

=== Yugoslavia ===
In the 1990s, tendencies appeared to deny or underestimate Yugoslavism, an option that is disastrous for the Croatian nation in all elements and periods. Many works were published about the interwar period, which explained the first Yugoslavia as a form of Serbian domination and persecution of Croats.

== Sources ==
Books

- Radonić, Ljiljana (2017). "Equalizing Jesus's, Jewish and Croat Suffering— Post-Socialist Politics of History in Croatia". In Luthar, Oto (ed.). Of Red Dragons and Evil Spirits: Post-Communist Historiography between Democratization and the New Politics of History. Central European University Press. ISBN 978-9-63386-151-6.
- MacDonald, David Bruce (2003). Balkan Holocausts?: Serbian and Croatian victim centred propaganda and the war in Yugoslavia. Manchester University Press. ISBN 978-0-7190-6467-8.
- Biondich, Mark (2004). "We Were Defending the State": Nationalism, Myth, and Memory in Twentieth-Century Croatia". In Lampe, John R.; Mazower, Mark (eds.). Ideologies and National Identities: The Case of Twentieth-Century Southeastern Europe. Central European University Press. ISBN 978-6-1550-5385-6.

Journals

- Koren, Snježana; Agičić, Damir (2023). "Between Political Constraints and Professional Historical Writing: Three Decades of Croatian Historiography (1990–2021)". Contemporary European History. 33 (3). Cambridge University Press: 878–885. doi:10.1017/S0960777323000486.
- Goldstein, Ivo (January 1994). "The Use of History: Croatian Historiography and Politics". Helsinki Monitor. 5: 85–97. doi:10.1163/157181494X00578.
- Iveljić, Iskra (2004). "Hrvatska historiografija o 19. stoljeću nakon raspada Jugoslavije" [Croat Historiography of the Nineteenth Century after the Disintegration of Yugoslavia]. Prispevki za novejšo zgodovino (in Slovenian). 44 (2): 29–44.
