= ICAES =

ICAES may refer to:

- Isothermal compressed air energy storage
- Congress of the International Union of Anthropological and Ethnological Sciences
