= CIPSH Chairs =

International academic research program

The CIPSH Chairs programme was created by the International Council for Philosophy and Human Sciences (French: Conseil International de Philosophie et des Sciences Humaines, CIPSH) in 2018 and is modelled after the programme of UNESCO Chairs. The programme is designed to highlight and encourage existing research networks of centres of research in the humanities and to attract greater attention to the humanities worldwide and enhanced recognition of their importance in contemporary society. CIPSH Chairs are established for a renewable period of five years.

== History ==
The programme was proposed and discussed by the 33rd General Assembly of CIPSH in Liège, Belgium on 6 August 2017 and created by the CIPSH Executive Committee on 16 April 2018 during its meeting in Xiamen, China. The first CIPSH Chairs were established in 2019.

== List of CIPSH chairs ==
	Name	Institution	Country	Chairholder	Established
1	New Humanities	University of California, Irvine	United States	Hsiung Ping-chen	2019
2	Ethnolinguistic Vitality & Diversity	Universiteit Leiden	Netherlands	Felix K. Amala	2019
3	Global Studies	Universidade Aberta	Portugal	José Eduardo Franco	2020
4	Digital Humanities in Education	Universidade Nova de Lisboa	Portugal	Carlos Ceia	2020
5	Diversity of Mathematical Research Cultures & Practices (DMRCP)	Universität Hamburg	Germany	Benedikt Löwe	2021
6	New Humanism: Spirituality & Secularity in the Modern World	Universiti Brunei Darussalam	Brunei	Tong Chee Kiong	2021
7	Cultural Heritage and Creative Humanities	Hang Seng University of Hong Kong	China	Desmond Hui	2024
8	Time: Conceptions, Experiences, and Expressions (Time-CEE)	Chinese Academy of Sciences	China	Xiaochun Sun	2024
9	Linguistics and Biodiversity	University of Ghana, Legon	Ghana	Adams Bodomo	2025
10	Geoethics	Istituto Nazionale di Geofisica e Vulcanologia	Italy	Silvia Peppoloni	2025
