= International Federation for Modern Languages and Literatures =

International academic organization

- Fédération Internationale des Langues et Littératures Modernes
- Abbreviation: FILLM
- Formation: 1928
- Founded at: Oslo, Norway
- Type: federation, academic, non-governmental
- Purpose: encourage the scholarly study of modern and medieval languages and literatures through international scholarly cooperation
- Fields: languages, literatures
- Members: 15 Member Associations
- Key people: Margaret Higonnet; President; Tom Clark; Secretary-General; Leena Eilittä; Treasurer; Adam Borch; Communications Officer
- Main organ: The FILLM Committee
- Affiliations: International Council for Philosophy and Humanistic Studies; UNESCO
- Website: www.fillm.org
- Formerly called: Commission Internationale d'Histoire Littéraire Moderne

The International Federation for Modern Languages and Literatures (FILLM, from the French: Fédération Internationale des Langues et Littératures Modernes) is an international academic organisation for scholarship in the field of languages and literatures.

FILLM is an umbrella organisation and its members are other academic organisations. In September 2016, the federation had fourteen member associations. As of August 2025, the federation has 19 members and 2 affiliates.

== History ==
FILLM was founded in Oslo in 1928 as the Commission Internationale d’Histoire Littéraire Moderne. In 1951 it was subsumed under the Conseil International de la Philosophie et des Sciences Humaines (CIPSH), which is a non-governmental organization under UNESCO.

In connection with FILLM's 6th Congress in Oxford, UK in 1954, the Association Internationale de Littérature Comparée (AILC) was founded.

During the last decades of the 20th century and the beginning of the 21st, FILLM experienced a period of questioning that reflected tensions in the humanistic studies, especially those addressing international issues. In 2003, David A. Wells edited an issue of Diogenes with "a view to introducing and explaining the history, purpose, and function of […] international learned societies", specifically FILLM itself and its member associations. The idea behind the issue had taken form during the 21st International FILLM Congress in Harare, Zimbabwe (1999) and, according to Wells, it was essentially a response to a more widespread crisis among larger academic organizations (in particular those concerned with languages and literature).

Wells notes that whereas academic organizations such as FILLM had experienced a period of rapid growth and success during the 1950s and 1960s, by the end of the 20th century their existence was "often questioned even by professional academics working within the discipline, and their very existence [was] largely unknown outside it, even to educated persons." Wells offers a number of explanations for this change, such as

- increased specialization within the fields
- a lack of financial support from governments
- the organizations' inability to create a useful function for themselves.

The issue of Diogenes was intended to create a greater awareness of the role and function of FILLM and its member associations.

== Officers and Governance ==
FILLM is managed by a Committee which is most often elected in connection with the federation's triennial Congresses. The Committee consists of a President, two Vice-Presidents, a Treasurer, a Communications Officer, a Secretary-General and up to seven Assistant Secretaries-General. In addition, each of FILLM's member associations is required to have a representative on the Committee.

Former officers include: Roger D. Sell (President), Nils-Erik Enqvist (President), Eva Kushner (President), Anders Pettersson (Secretary-General) and Rosemary Ross Johnston (Assistant Secretary-General).

== Membership and Member Associations ==
FILLM does not have individual members. Its members are instead other international academic associations. In 2003, the Europa World Yearbook (2003) recorded FILLM to have nineteen member associations while the special issue of Diogenes edited by David A. Wells included contributions from eighteen associations.

As of 17 September 2016, the following associations are recorded as members of FILLM:

- Association for Commonwealth Language and Literature Studies (ACLALS)
- Association Internationale de Littérature Comparée (AILC)
- Associazione internazionale per gli studi di lingua e letterature italiane (AISLLI)
- Asociación de Lingüística y Filología de América Latina (ALFAL)
- Association for Rhetoric and Communication in Southern Africa (ARCSA)
- Australasian Universities Language and Literature Association (AULLA)
- The European Society for the Study of English (ESSE)
- The Global Rhetoric Society (GRS)
- International Association for Dialogue Analysis (IADA)
- International Association for Scandinavian Studies (IASS)
- International Association of University Professors of English (IAUPE)
- International Association for the Oral Literatures of Africa (ISOLA)
- The Finnish Literary Research Society (KTS)
- The Modern Language Association (MLA)
- West African Modern Languages Association (WAMLA)

== Activities ==
FILLM's main activity is the organization of its Triennial International Congresses.

== Publications ==
With some exceptions, FILLM's Triennial Congresses have been followed by the publication of a volume of Congress proceedings.

Beyond these, the federation have been responsible for a few special publications, for example the special issue of Diogenes discussed above.

FILLM publishes a book series entitled FILLM Studies in Modern Languages and Literatures in collaboration with John Benjamins Publishing. The book series is a direct response to twentieth-century professionalization and specialization which, despite its advantages, have "tended to divide scholars into many separate and often smallish groupings between which communication could be rather sporadic". The book series has been created "in the hope of fostering a truly international community of scholars within which a rich diversity of interests would be upheld by a common sense of human relevance". It aims to do so by publishing books which:

"[...] deal with languages and literatures world-wide, and are written in jargon-light English that will be immediately understandable and attractive to any likely reader. Every book presents original findings [...] which will be of prime interest to those who are experts in its particular field of discussion, but also seeks to engage readers whose concerns have hitherto lain elsewhere."

As of 17 September 2016, four volumes have been published in FILLM Studies in Languages and Literatures.
