= Joep Leerssen =

Dutch comparatist and cultural historian (born 1955)

Joseph Theodoor "Joep" Leerssen (born 12 June 1955, Leiden) is a Dutch comparatist and cultural historian. He is Emeritus Professor of Modern European Literature at the University of Amsterdam, and Emeritus Professor at Maastricht University with a research brief on "Limburg and Europe". He was awarded the Spinozapremie in 2008 and the Madame de Staël Prize in 2020.

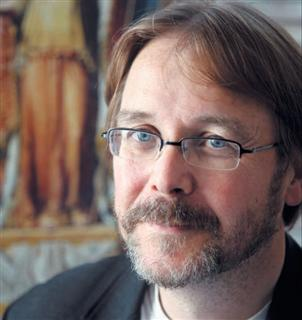
Joep Leerssen in 2007

== Life ==
Leerssen grew up in the Maastricht area; he studied Comparative literature in Aachen (M.A. 1979) and Anglo-Irish Studies at University College Dublin (M.A. 1980), and received his doctorate from Utrecht University in 1986. He was appointed lecturer in European Studies in Amsterdam in 1986 and was given a professorial chair in the same subject in 1991. He has held guest professorships and visiting fellowships in Harvard (Erasmus Chair), Cambridge (Magdalene College), Göttingen and the École normale supérieure (Paris). He headed the Huizinga Institute, the Dutch National Research Institute for Cultural History, from 1996 until 2005. In 2008 he was elected to the Royal Netherlands Academy of Arts and Sciences, which awarded him an "Academy Professorship" in 2015. He retired from his Amsterdam chair in 2022.

Leerssen is married to the Irish cultural historian Ann Rigney; they have two children.

== Work ==
Leerssen has worked in the fields of Irish Studies, imagology, European studies and Limburg regional history. His main research focus is on the relationship between national (self-)stereotyping and nationalism, and on the historical development of cultural and romantic nationalism in nineteenth-century Europe, using literary texts as a source for the history of ideas.

=== Irish studies ===
Leerssen's books Mere Irish & Fíor-Ghael (1986, repr. 1996) and Remembrance and Imagination (1996) deal with the pre-1800 and 19th-century emergence of an Irish national identity, foregrounding processes of Gaelic-English interactions within Irish history and the role of cultural memory in the Gaelic revival, the Irish Literary Revival and Irish nationalism. Leerssen is an honorary member of the Royal Irish Academy, an Honorary Fellow of Trinity College Dublin, and has held the Parnell Lecturership at Magdalene College, Cambridge. While reluctant to see the Irish historical condition as simply a colonial one, he has highlighted the fact that Ireland's print capitalism and public sphere were until c. 1850 a monopoly of the country's Protestant, English-language settler class, to the exclusion of the country's Gaelic-speaking, Catholic population; he considers the adoption of a Gaelic-rooted historical consciousness among Ireland’s urban, middle-class, English-speaking population a highly remarkable instance of an intra-national cultural transfer, tantamount to a "cultural brain transplant". Leerssen has also identified the affect he terms "auto-exoticism": a tendency for Irish writers, long habituated to the need to explain their country to an English readership, to internalize that readership's exoticist attitude and to characterize their own country in terms of its unusualness and non-normalcy; related to this is a tendency to imagine the course of time as running in Ireland to be slightly out of synch with the rest of the world and its modernity.

=== Imagology ===
Imagology (co-edited with Manfred Beller, 2007) is a handbook on the literary articulation of stereotypes of national characters. This field of studies is concerned with the study of "ethnotypes": cross-national perceptions and images of nations' alleged temperaments and characteristics. The emphasis is on the literary expression of ethnotypes, but their impact in (geo)political thought and propaganda is also addressed. Leerssen edits a book series on the topic, Studia Imagologica, and curates the website Imagologica. For his imagological work, he was elected a corresponding member of the Austrian Academy of Sciences in 2012; in 2014 he received an honorary doctorate from the University of Bucharest.

=== Nationalism studies ===
National Thought in Europe a survey of the culture-historical growth of nationalism in Europe. In the field of nationalism studies, Leerssen takes up an intermediary position between the approaches of ethnosymbolism and modernism, stressing "the long memory and the short history" of nationalism. While emphasizing the agency of culture in the rise and spread of nationalism, he considers this culture to consist of a set of literary myths and stereotypes which only in modern times, under the influence of Romantic historicism, came to be mistaken for long-standing ethnic continuities. Additionally, national identities always take shape by opposing the nation to a (historically changeable) variety of stereotyped foreigners; Leerssen defines nationalism as the "political instrumentalization" of such self/other-stereotypes. Since nationalism always involves an oppositional dynamics between different societies, and can therefore never be adequately comprehended on a single-country basis, Leerssen pleads for a rigorously transnational, comparative approach. He has applied this in his large-scale Encyclopedia of Romantic Nationalism in Europe (2nd ed. 2022) and in his study Charismatic Nations, which charts the cultural history of nationalism from 1800 to the present (2026).

=== Limburg regional history ===
Within The Netherlands, Leerssen was involved in the official recognition of Limburgish as a regional language; he has written literary work in Limburgish and spends part of his time in his home village of Mheer. Leerssen was the first incumbent of the King Willem Alexander Chair in Low Countries Studies at the University of Liège in 2017 and was given a research professorship in 2018 at Maastricht University to explore the transnational entanglement of this Netherlands periphery. In 2025 he presented a five-part television series on Limburg history, entitled "Limburg in the World" (Limburg in de Waereld).

== Selected publications ==
- (1984) Komparatistik in Grossbritannien
- (1986) Mere Irish and Fíor-Ghael
- (1995) Historische verkenning van Mheer (with Wim Senden)
- (1996) Remembrance and Imagination
- (2006) National Thought in Europe (3rd ed. 2018)
- (2006) De bronnen van het vaderland
- (2007) Imagology (edited, with Manfred Beller)
- (2008) Editing the Nation's Memory (edited, with Dirk Van Hulle)
- (2009) The Rhetoric of National Character (special issue, edited with Ton Hoenselaars, of the European Journal of English Studies)
- (2011) Spiegelpaleis Europa
- (2014) Commemorating Writers in Nineteenth-Century Europe (edited, with Ann Rigney)
- (2015) Nationalisme
- (2018) Encyclopedia of Romantic Nationalism in Europe (editor; 2nd ed. 2022)
- (2018) The Rhine (edited, with Manfred Beller)
- (2019) Comparative Literature in Britain
- (2020) Parnell and his Times
- (2021) World Fairs and the Global Moulding of National Identities (edited, with Eric Storm)
- (2026) Charismatic Nations: A Cultural History of Nationalism in Europe from 1800 to the Present
