= Madhumita Das =

Indian academic

- Occupations: Academic, researcher

Academic background
- Education: Utkal University

Madhumita Das (Odia: ମଧୁମିତା ଦାସ) is an Indian academic was the vice-chancellor of Fakir Mohan University, Balasore, Odisha, India from 2017 until 2020. She served several important positions in different national and international institutions such as the South Asian Association of Women Geoscientists (SAAWG), International Association for Promoting Geoethics (IAPG), Italy etc.

== Education ==
Das pursued M.Sc and Ph.D in geology from Utkal University, Odisha. She specialised in the area of Igneous petrology, Industrial minerals and Environmental Geology.

== Career ==
Das has a teaching and research career spanning more than 39 years. In July 2017 she was appointed as the vice-chancellor of Fakir Mohan University, Balasore. Odisha, India. She assumed the position on 2 August 2017. Before joining this position she was working as a geology professor in Utkal University, Bhubaneswar, Odisha.

She has served several important positions in different institutions and organizations. In 1989–90 she was also a German Academic Exchange Service (DAAD) fellow. She was a coordinator at National Working Group. UGC-SAP-DRS, of Utkal University. She is currently the vice-president of South Asian Association of Women Geoscientists (SAAWG) and a member of International Association for Promoting Geoethics (IAPG).

As of 2017, she published more than 120 research papers in different journals. She completed 7 research project supported by University Grants Commission. She mentored 1 D.Sc, 17 Ph. D and 21 M.Phil students.
