= Fernando Galván =

Fernando Galván OBE, FEA
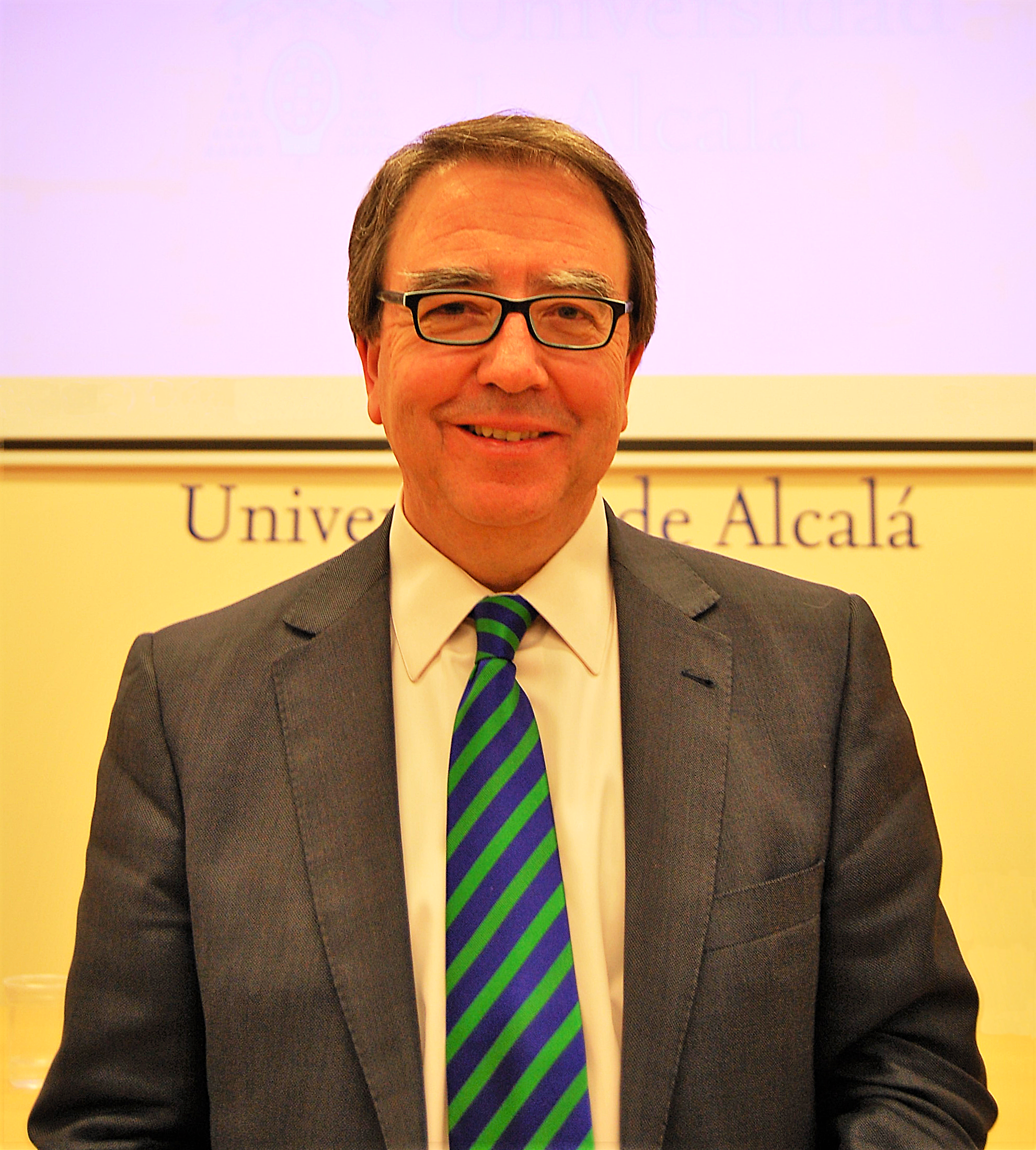
- Born: Fernando Galván Reula; 24 July 1957 (age 69); Las Palmas de Gran Canaria, Spain

Academic background
- Education: University of La Laguna

Academic work
- Discipline: English literature Comparative literature
- Institutions: University of Alcalá
- Main interests: medieval English literature
- Notable works: Spanish translations of classical English literature

Fernando Galván Reula OBE, FEA (born in Las Palmas de Gran Canaria, Spain, 24 July 1957), is a literary scholar and former rector / president of the University of Alcalá (2010–2018), Madrid.

== Biography ==
He holds a BA (1979) and a PhD (1981) in English from the University of La Laguna, Tenerife, a university where he was appointed Professor of English Language and Literature in 1990. He moved to the University of Alcalá in 1994, where he was appointed as Professor of English Literature, and later as rector / president between 2010 and 2018. In 2023 he was distinguished with the honorary appointment as Rector / President Emeritus by the Governing Council of the university.

His expertise is in medieval English literature, but he also edited and translated into Spanish numerous classical literary works from other periods of English literature, and has published widely on modern and contemporary narrative in English, as well as in postcolonial literatures. He is member of the editorial boards of more than twenty international scholarly journals in English studies, and has supervised 26 PhD dissertations in that field in the period 1988–2025.

He was visiting scholar in the Department of Comparative Literature of Harvard University in 1993 and 1994. He was appointed in 1994 member of the International Association of University Professors of English (IAUPE), and in 2003 corresponding fellow (FEA) of The English Association, in the UK. During the academic years 2009–2010 and 2018-2019 he was associate member of the Faculty of English at the University of Oxford; in October 2009 was appointed visiting fellow of Corpus Christi College, Oxford and in 2018-2019 was a member of the SCR of Exeter College, Oxford.

He has held numerous relevant academic positions in Spain and internationally: as member of the boards of the European Association for American Studies (EAAS, 1993–1999), and of the Spanish Society for General and Comparative Literature (SELGYC, 1995–2006); president of the Spanish Association of Anglo-American Studies (AEDEAN, 1996–2002), and president of the European Society for the Study of English (ESSE, 2007–2013). He was also secretary general of the International Association of University Presidents (IAUP) in 2021–2024.

== Works ==
He has edited and translated into Spanish many classical authors of English literature from the modern and contemporary periods, such as Philip Sidney, John Milton, Daniel Defoe, Samuel Richardson, Henry Fielding, William Wordsworth, Charles Dickens, Oscar Wilde, James Joyce, Joseph Conrad, George Orwell or Graham Greene. He has also published comparative literary and cultural studies of English and Spanish-speaking countries. In addition to his books on medieval English literature he has published on English novelists of the 19th and 20th centuries. He has edited critical essays on Mary Wollstonecraft, English metafiction, magical realism, or culture and power. He is the author of more than a hundred scholarly articles and book chapters on English-speaking contemporary poets and writers.

== Distinctions ==
He has been awarded honorary PhD degrees by the

- University of Glasgow (DLitt, 2012),
- National Autonomous University of Nicaragua in León (2012),
- National University of Villarrica del Espíritu Santo in Paraguay (2014),
- San Sebastián University in Chile (2016),
- National University of Political Studies and Public Administration in Bucharest, Romania (2017).
- Caucasus University, Tbilisi, Georgia (2019)
- West University of Timișoara, Romania (2021)
- Miguel de Cervantes University, Chile (2024)

He has also been distinguished as

- "Academic Order Simón Bolívar" by the Universidad Simón Bolívar, Colombia (2010),
- "Honorary Diploma" by the Federal University of the South in Rostov, Russia (2011),
- "Police Merit Cross", by the National Police Corps, Spain (2011),
- Award from the Secretary of Education of the Government of the state of Jalisco, Mexico (2012),
- Award from the Secretary of Education of the Government of the Free and Sovereign State of Puebla, Mexico (2012),
- "Honorary Member" by the Universidad de La Serena, Chile (2012),
- Commander of the "Order of Bernardo O'Higgins", by the president of the Republic of Chile (2013),
- "Honorary Fellow" of the National Academy of History and Geography of the National Autonomous University of Mexico (UNAM) (2016),
- "Distinguished Visitor" of the Universidad Nacional Pedro Henríquez Ureña in Dominican Republic (2016),
- Award from the National University of San Marcos de Lima, Peru, for the strengthening of academic ties between that university and Alcalá (2017),
- "Honorary Officer" of the Order of the British Empire, OBE, by Queen Elizabeth II (2018).
- "Adoptive Son" of the town hall of Alcalá de Henares (2025)
