= A. L. Mentxaka =

Basque writer (died 2022)

- Died: 11 February 2022; Dublin, Ireland

Aintzane Legarreta Mentxaka (died 10 February 2022) was a Basque writer and academic, who was based in Dublin, County Dublin, Leinster, Ireland.

== Biography ==
Mentxaka was a scholar of English literature, specialising in modernism. She is the author of The Postcolonial Traveller (2016), and Kate O'Brien and the Fiction of Identity (2011). According to The Irish Examiner, "[her] prose is clear, well-written and informative, and opens new and fascinating doors to the interpretation of O'Brien's novels". The Postcolonial Traveller offers, in the words of Paddy Woodworth, a series of "sophisticated arguments" on O'Brien's novel Mary Lavelle, analysing it "provocatively and . . . fruitfully". According to the European Journal of English Studies, Kate O'Brien and the Fiction of Identity reads like "a challenging detective story, scholarly, yet unpredictable." Mentxaka has published on the work of Woolf, Joyce, Richardson, Kate O'Brien, and others.

She also wrote plays. They include A Pair of New Eyes (2013), For Valentine (2009, 2014), Visitor (AD 1585) (2015), One Nite Stand: A Shakespearean Tragicomedy (2014), Alien in Bewleys (1999), and Grainne (2015, co-written with J. Costello, K. Doyle, and L. Errity). The play A Pair of New Eyes was included in "Ten Things To Do" in Gay Community News magazine, which summarised it as "Romance, friendship, betrayal, seduction, and two respectable ladies". Mentxaka collaborated with a group of writers for a performance of The Ministers.

Mentxaka lectured at American College Dublin. She has also worked at Dublin City University, and at University College Dublin, where she completed a post-doctoral research fellowship on Modernism.

She died in Dublin on 10 February 2022.
