= Ann Rigney =

Irish/Dutch cultural scholar

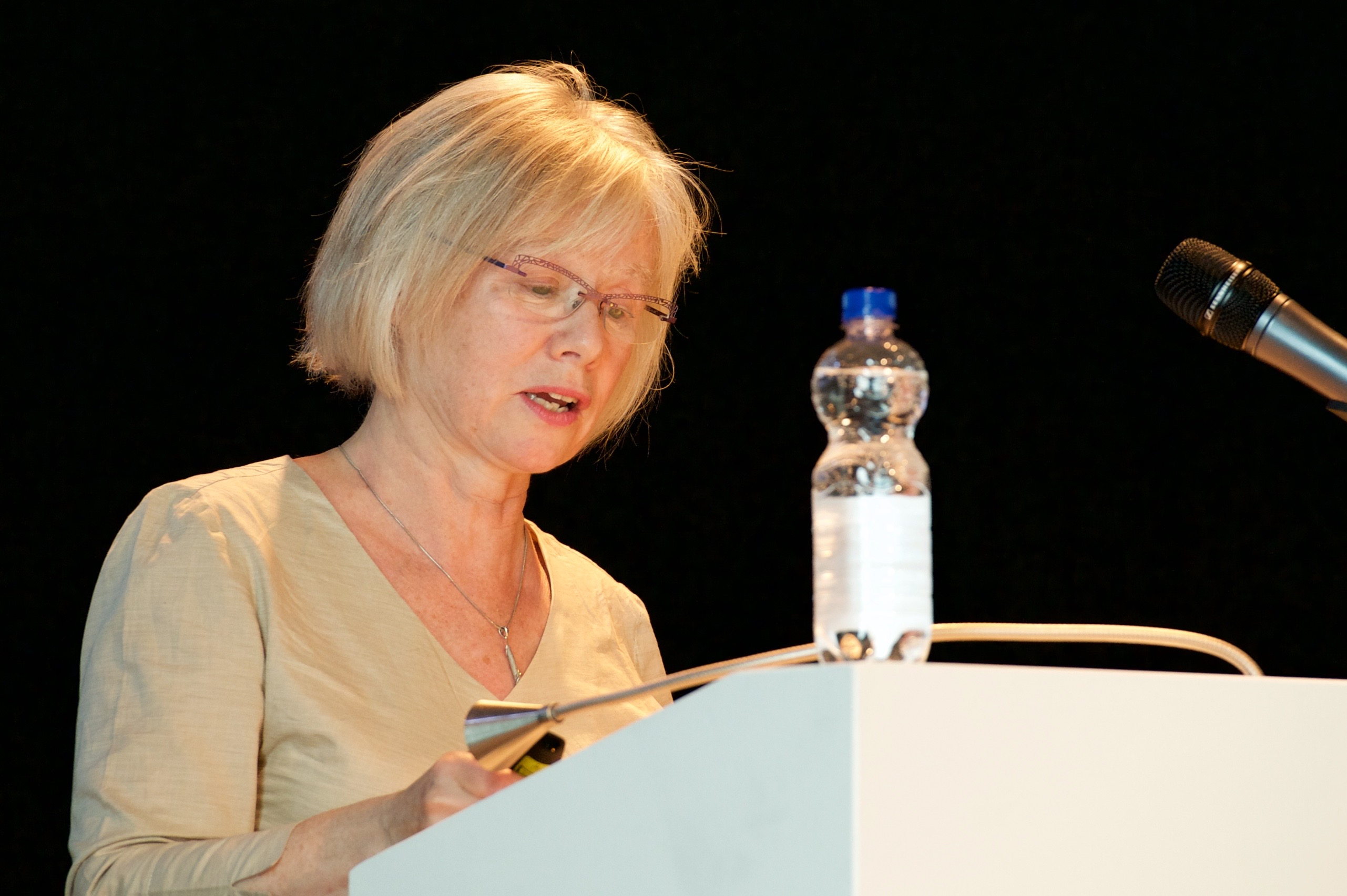
Ann Rigney

Ann Rigney (Dublin, 9 December 1957) is an Irish/Dutch cultural scholar and Professor of Comparative Literature at Utrecht University. Her research focuses on the transnational interaction between narrative and cultural memory and is authoritative in the field of Memory Studies.

== Life ==
Rigney was born in Dublin and studied English and French at University College Dublin (BA 1978, MA 1980). In 1987 she gained her PhD at the University of Toronto in Comparative Literature . From 1988 to 2000 she was a lecturer in Literary Theory at the Comparative Literature programme, University of Utrecht; in 2000 she was appointed Professor of Comparative Literature at the Vrije Universiteit Amsterdam. In 2003 she was appointed to the Chair of Comparative Literature at the University of Utrecht.

Rigney is married to the Dutch cultural historian Joep Leerssen; they have two children.

== Research ==
Most of Rigney's research deals with the interactive dynamics between narrative (in literature and other media) and cultural memory. Her early work dealt with narrative and imaginative strategies in history-writing and historical novels, with special attention to writers like Jules Michelet, Thomas Carlyle and Sir Walter Scott. She then turned to more general models of how the past is configured in the present-day imagination, and to the question how this imagination is expressed and communicated. Building on the earlier work of Hayden White, Pierre Nora and Aleida Assmann, Rigney's research focuses on the dynamics of cultural memory: how are memories expressed across different media and how do they move between different audiences, generations or nationalities?

Rigneys work has recently shifted from a nineteenth-century to a contemporary focus. Her work since 2000 has dealt with the poetics and function of public apologies and with the cultural memory of political activism

Among Rigney's theoretical concepts and models are

- the principle of cultural scarcity, meaning that cultural expressions have to compete for a limited reservoir of public attention and will try to pack a maximum of historical significance into as concise an expression as possible;
- the fact that the canonicity of historical memory is commensurate with its likelihood to be expressed in different media;
  - these media involve, besides the textual or visual, also the tactile and the performative (tourism, memorabilia, re-enactment events);
  - these media all have their specific conventions and formal structures, which will in turn affect the nature of how memories are articulated and communicated.
- the mobility of memories along a twofold axis: intermedial as well as transnational, and their wide impact on social practices.
- the role of "embodied communities" (analogously to Benedict Anderson’s Imagined Communities): physical gatherings of people (often festive) for commemorative or identity-affirming purposes.

Rigney has evinced a wish to see Memory Studies move beyond its "traumatic paradigm", i.e. its tendency to concentrate on those collective memories that involve suffering and catastrophes.

In her historiographical theory she resists a view of history centered on ideal-typical historians (as academics in history departments writing archive-based books on the social and political history of their own country); this, she argues, fails to do justice to the wide range of practices, academic and otherwise, through which societies take account of the past.

== Honours, awards and grants ==
Rigney's book Imperfect Histories was awarded the 2001 Jean-Pierre Barricelli Award by the American Conference on Romanticism. She held visiting research fellowships at the University of Liège (1984-1985), Trinity College Dublin (1995), the Netherlands Institute for Advanced Studies (2009-2010), the University of Konstanz (research group History and Memory, 2011), and at the Lichtenberg Kolleg (Institute for Advanced Study), University of Göttingen (2012).

She was one of the working group leaders in the COST action "In Search for Transcultural Memory in Europe" (2012-2016). This led to the establishment of the Network in Transnational Memory Studies (NITMES), which won a €59,000 grant from NWO, the Netherlands national funding agency for scientific research, in 2015.

In 2018 she was awarded a European Research Council Advanced grant for the research project Remembering Activism: The Cultural Memory of Protest in Europe (REACT).

Rigney has been an elected a member of the Royal Netherlands Academy of Arts and Sciences since in 2005. She is also an elected member of the Royal Holland Society of Sciences and Humanities (Koninklijke Hollandsche Maatschappij der Wetenschappen), and of Academia Europaea. She holds an honorary doctorate from Aarhus University.

She is a founding member of the Memory Studies Association and sits on its advisory board; she also sits on the advisory board of the journal Memory Studies and of the Memory Studies book series (Palgrave Macmillan).

In 2022 she was elected a member of the Royal Irish Academy.

== Works ==
- Rigney, Ann (21 February 1991). The Rhetoric of Historical Representation: Three Narrative Histories of the French Revolution (1 ed.). Cambridge University Press. doi:10.1017/cbo9780511549946. ISBN 978-0-521-38152-9.
- Rigney, Ann (2001). Imperfect histories : the elusive past and the legacy of romantic historicism. American Council of Learned Societies. Ithaca: Cornell University Press. ISBN 0-8014-3861-6. OCLC 649768601.
- Mediation, remediation, and the dynamics of cultural memory. Astrid Erll, Ann Rigney. Berlin: W. de Gruyter. 2009. ISBN 978-3-11-021738-4. OCLC 516475435.
- Rigney, Ann (2012). The afterlives of Walter Scott : memory on the move. Oxford: Oxford University Press. ISBN 978-0-19-964401-8. OCLC 760290400.
- Reconciliation and Remembrance: Critical Perspectives, co-edited with Nicole Immler and Damien Short. Special issue (5.2) of Memory Studies (2012).
- Commemorating writers in nineteenth-century Europe : nation-building and centenary fever. Joseph Th Leerssen, Ann Rigney. Houndmills, Basingstoke, Hampshire. 2014. ISBN 978-1-137-41214-0. OCLC 885192801.
- Rigney, Ann; De Cesari, Chiara, eds. (2014). Transnational memory : circulation, articulation, scales. Berlin. ISBN 978-3-11-035910-7. OCLC 894891697.
- Audiovisual Memory and the (Re)Making of Europe, co-edited with Astrid Erll. Special issue (18.1) of Image [&] Narrative (2017)
- Cultural Memory Studies after the Transnational Turn, co-edited with Astrid Erll. Special issue (11.3) of Memory Studies (2018)
- Brillenburg Wurth, Kiene (2019). The life of texts : an introduction to literary studies. Ann Rigney. Amsterdam. ISBN 978-90-485-5190-3. OCLC 1134075645.
