= International Congress of Anthropology and Prehistoric Archaeology =

Anthropology and Prehistoric Archaeology conference

International Congress of Anthropology and Prehistoric Archaeology Congrès international d'anthropologie et d'archéologie préhistoriques
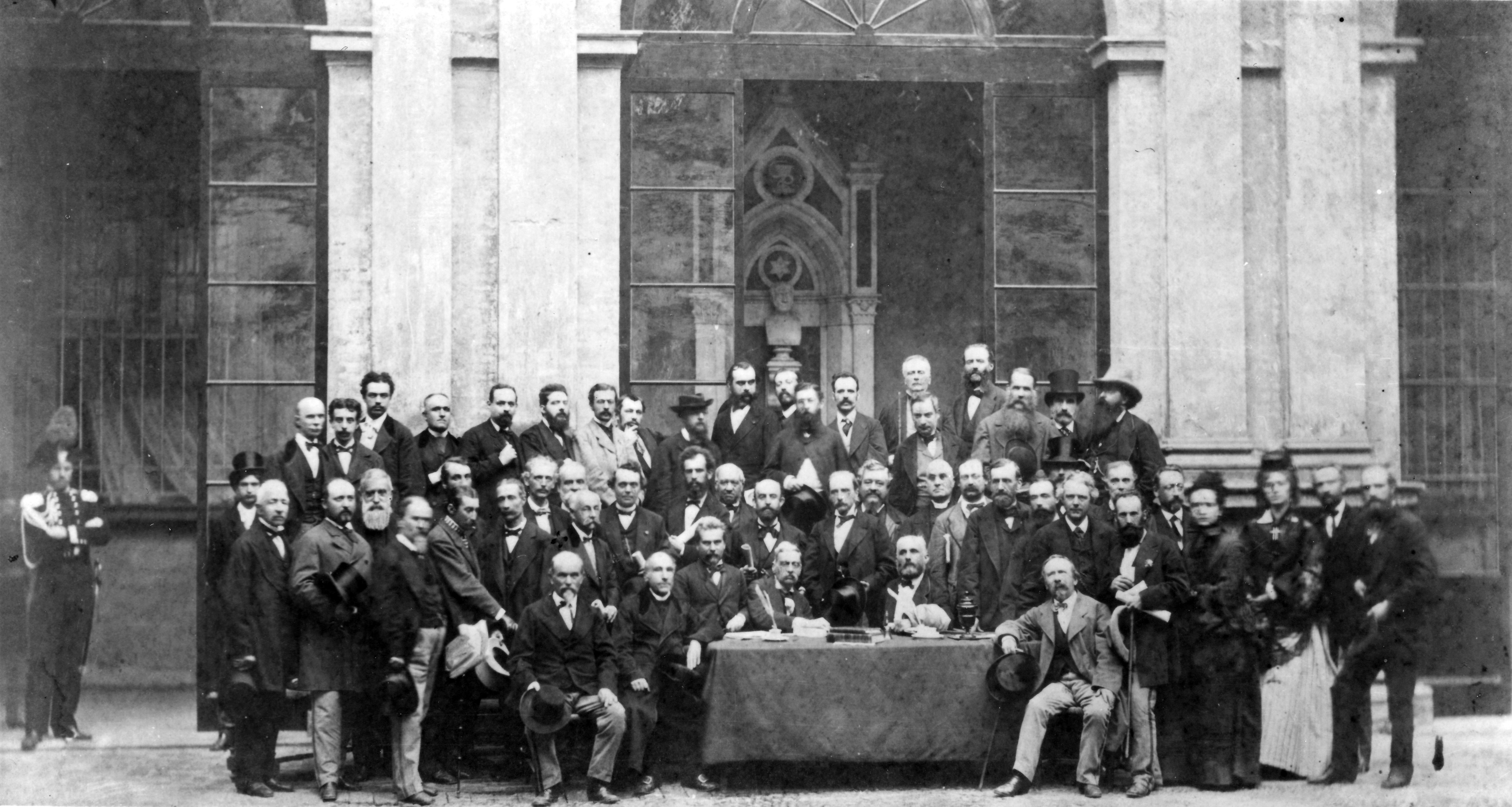
- Fifth International Congress of Anthropology and Prehistoric Archaeology in Bologna, Italy, 1871
- Genre: Anthropology and Archaeology conference
- Location: Varies
- Country: Varies
- Founded: 1865; 161 years ago, La Spezia, Italy

The International Congress of Anthropology and Prehistoric Archaeology (French: Congrès international d'anthropologie et d'archéologie préhistoriques – CIAAP) was an international conference and a learned society focused on the study of human origins, prehistoric cultures, and archaeological findings.

== History ==
The congress was established on the initiative of Gabriel de Mortillet and Édouard Desor. Other founding members include Giovanni Capellini, Emilio Cornalia, and Antonio Stoppani. A meeting of the Italian Society of Natural Sciences (Italian: Società Italiana di Scienze Naturali) in La Spezia, Italy in 1865 led to the creation of the International Palaeoethnological Congress (French: Congrès paléoethnologique international – CPI) which convened for the first time the following year. At the second congress, in 1867, that original name was changed to International Congress of Anthropology and Prehistoric Archaeology (French: Congrès international d'anthropologie et d'archéologie préhistoriques – CIAAP), and a permanent council was formally established in 1880.

Between 1866 and 1912, a total of fourteen international congresses were held. The fifteenth congress, originally scheduled for Leiden in 1916, aimed to expand its scope beyond that of previous gatherings, reflecting shifting research priorities and needs in the field. However, these plans were derailed by the outbreak of World War I, leading to its cancellation. After the end of the war, the International Institute of Anthropology (French: Institut international d'anthropologie – IIA) reestablished a series of international congresses, attempting to continue the tradition of the International Congress of Anthropology and Prehistoric Archaeology. This attempt, however, was hampered by the fact that scholars from the defeated nations of the war (Germany, Austria, Turkey) were excluded from the meetings, by the lack of representation from countries other than France on the governing body of the Institute, and also by the dominance of anthropology at the expense of prehistoric archaeology in its activities.

Subsequent efforts between the executive committee of the IIA and the surviving members of the permanent council of the CIAAP to reinitiate the series of CIAAP congresses under the leadership of the IIA led to an agreement to organize the fourth session of the IIA in 1930 in Portugal concurrently as the fifteenth session of the CIAAP. However, this initiative was only able to overcome existing divisions to a limited extent, and as a result of discussions held in the wake of the meeting in Portugal, it was decided to adjourn the fifteenth congress. Many scholars, both from the fields of anthropology and prehistoric archaeology, felt frustrated by the IIA's approach, and in 1931 the International Congress of Prehistoric and Protohistoric Sciences (French: Congrès international des Sciences préhistoriques et protohistoriques – CISPP) was established as a direct successor to the International Congress of Anthropology and Prehistoric Archaeology, followed in 1933 by the International Congress of Anthropological and Ethnological Sciences (French: Congrès international des Sciences anthropologiques et ethnologiques – CISAE), to cater separately to the need for an international forum dedicated to prehistoric and protohistoric archaeology on the one hand, and to anthropology and ethnology on the other. The first CISPP congress took place in London in 1932, and the first CISAE congress in London and Oxford in 1934, with future congresses of each branch to be held every four years, alternating biannually.

=== First International Congress ===
In 1866, the first International Palaeoethnological Congress was held in the town of Neuchâtel in Switzerland. Swiss naturalist Pierre Jean Édouard Desor was the president of the Organizing Committee.

=== Second International Congress ===
In Paris, France, the name of the 1867 congress was changed to the International Congress of Prehistoric Anthropology and Archaeology (French: Congrès international d'anthropologie et d'archéologie préhistoriques (CIAAP).

=== Third International Congress ===
The third congress took place in Norwich on August 20, 1868, and closed in London on August 28. Sir John Lubbock, 1st Baron Avebury served as the president of the Organizing Committee.

=== Fourth International Congress ===
In 1869, 340 participants from 17 European and American countries convened at the fourth congress in Copenhagen, Denmark, from August 27 to September 5. Danish archaeologist Jens Jacob Asmussen Worsaae presided over the Organizing Committee.

=== Fifth International Congress ===
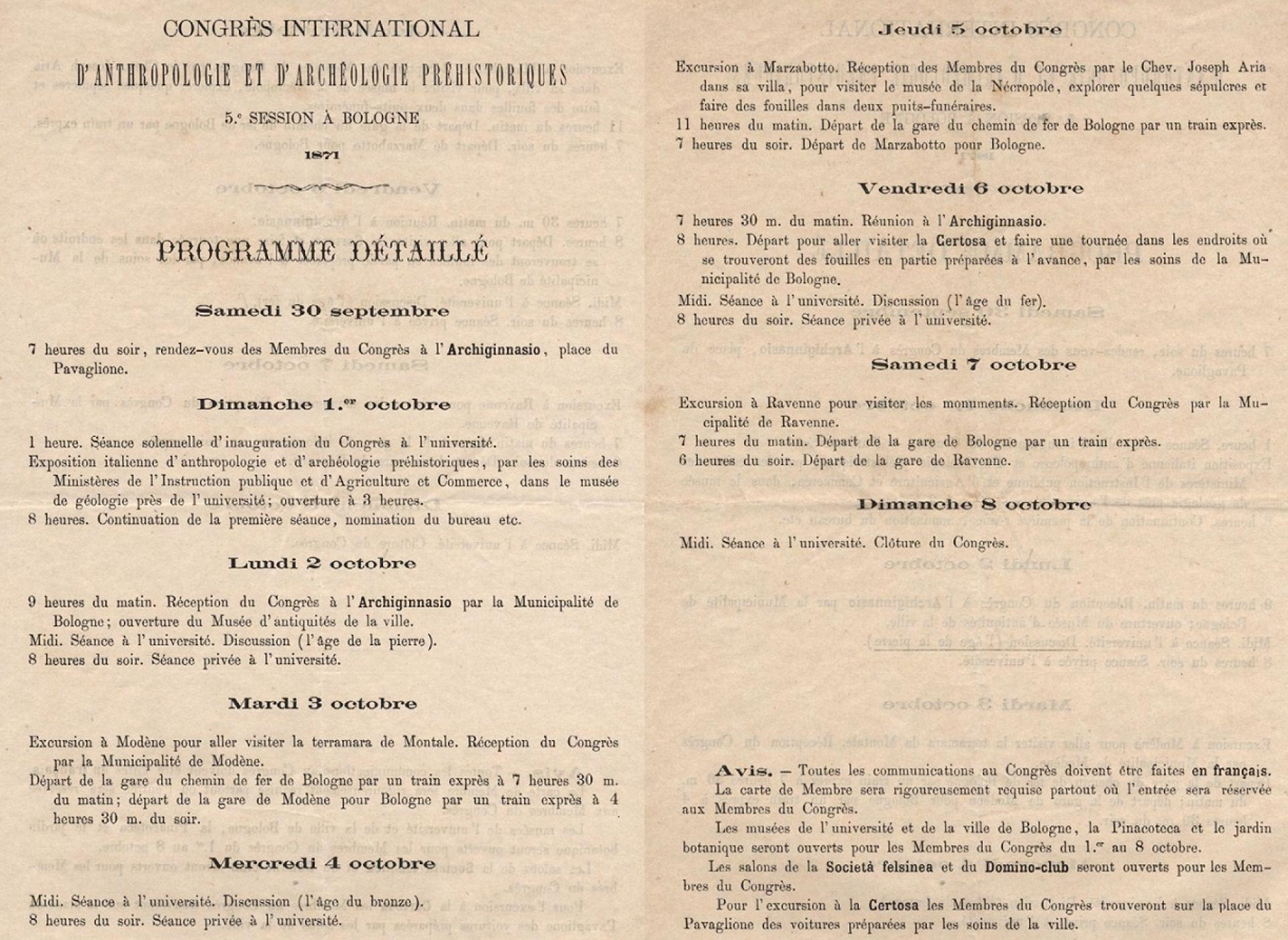
Programme of the Fifth International Congress of Anthropology and Prehistoric Archaeology, Bologna, Italy, 1871

The fifth International Congress of Anthropology and Prehistoric Archaeology was held in Bologna, Italy in 1871 and established the Archaeological Civic Museum of Bologna. Giovanni Gozzadini, an Italian archaeologist, chaired the Organizing Committee.

=== Sixth International Congress ===
In 1872, the sixth International Congress of Anthropology and Prehistoric Archaeology convened in Brussels, Belgium, from August 22 to August 30, under the presidency of Jean Baptiste Julien d'Omalius d'Halloy. The congress had more than 650 members from 17 different countries.

=== Seventh International Congress ===
Opening on August 7, 1874, the seventh International Congress took place in Stockholm. At the Swedish House of Nobility, the conference was commenced by Count Henning Hamilton who was the Grand Chancellor of the Universities of Sweden and President of the Organizing Committee.

=== Eighth International Congress ===
In 1876, Budapest hosted the International Congress from September 4 to September 11. The Organizing Committee was led by Ferenc Pulszky, Professor F.F. Romer served as secretary, and Sándor Havas was the treasurer. Franz Joseph I of Austria was the 'protecteur de la session' or honorary patron.

=== Ninth International Congress ===
From September 20 to September 29, 1880, the ninth session of the Congrés Internacional d'Anthropologie et d'Archéologie Préhistoriques (CIAAP) was held in Lisbon, Portugal. Portuguese politician João de Andrade Corvo was the president, Teixeira de Aragão served as treasurer, and Portuguese geologist Carlos Ribeiro acted as the secretary of the Organizing Committee. The honorary president of the session was Ferdinand II of Portugal. The congress members visited a number of sites in central and northern Portugal, among them the Caves of Poço Velho.

=== Tenth International Congress ===
The tenth International Congress of Anthropology and Prehistoric Archaeology was held in Paris, France, in 1889. French biologist Jean Louis Armand de Quatrefages served as the president of the congress, which welcomed attendees from 27 countries on all five continents.

=== Eleventh International Congress ===
In 1892, the eleventh Congress took place in Moscow, Russia, marking the first time the event was hosted in Eastern Europe, significantly expanding the geographical coverage of congress venues. This shift in geographical focus is also borne out in the two volumes of the congress proceedings, which incorporate a significant number of contributions dealing with the geology, palaeontology, anthropology and archaeology of the Russian Empire.

=== Twelfth International Congress ===
The twelfth Congress returned to Paris, France, in 1900, coinciding with the turn of the century and the Exposition Universelle. This timing provided a fitting backdrop for discussions on the latest archaeological discoveries and anthropological theories, allowing participants to reflect on the progress made in the field over the past decades since the inception of the congress. French archaeologist Alexandre Bertrand presided over the event.

=== Thirteenth International Congress ===
From April 16 to April 21, 1906, at Monaco, the International Congress held its thirteenth conference by invitation of Albert I, Prince of Monaco. Four hundred members met at the Oceanographic Museum of Monaco. The next congress did not occur until six years later.

=== Fourteenth International Congress ===
Held in Geneva, Switzerland, the fourteenth Congress, led by Professor Eugène Pittard, took place from September 9 to 14, 1912. It brought together 149 delegates from 112 institutions and 20 nations, with 12 nations sending official government delegates.

=== Fifteenth International Congress (cancelled) ===
Although discussions appear to have been held at the fourteenth congress to convene the fifteenth congress in Madrid, Spain in 1915, it was eventually scheduled to be held in Leiden, The Netherlands in 1916, but did not take place due to the outbreak of the First World War. Initial plans for the resumption of the 1916 congress in the aftermath of the war were allowed to lapse when the International Institute of Anthropology established its own series of congresses. Despite a vote held at the IIA's fourth session in 1930 to declare the event concurrently the fifteenth International Congress of Anthropology and Prehistoric Archaeology and to hold a supplementary session of the congress the following year in Paris, which would be IIA's fifth session but still count concurrently as part of the fifteenth International Congress of Anthropology and Prehistoric Archaeology, the exclusion of CIAAP members who were not also IIA members from the voting process led to a rejection of the outcome of that vote and to a further adjournment of the fifteenth congress. The IIA went ahead with the publication of the proceedings from its 1930 and 1931 meetings under the CIAAP label regardless, causing further conflict with the surviving members of CIAAP's permanent council. The organization of separate meetings for anthropology and for prehistoric archaeology by the newly constituted International Congress of Anthropological and Ethnological Sciences and International Congress of Prehistoric and Protohistoric Sciences in the following years brought a definitive end to the plans for holding a fifteenth CIAAP congress.

== Congress locations and dates ==
Number	Year	Location	Notes
1st	1866	Neuchâtel, Switzerland	Proceedings published in one volume
2nd	1867	Paris, France	Proceedings published in one volume
3rd	1868	Norwich/London, England	Proceedings published in one volume
4th	1869	Copenhagen, Denmark	Proceedings published in one volume
5th	1871	Bologna, Italy	Proceedings published in one volume
6th	1872	Brussels, Belgium	Proceedings published in one volume
7th	1874	Stockholm, Sweden	Proceedings published in two volumes
8th	1876	Budapest, Austria-Hungary	Proceedings published in three volumes
9th	1880	Lisbon, Portugal	Proceedings published in one volume
10th	1889	Paris, France	Proceedings published in one volume
11th	1892	Moscow, Russia	Proceedings published in two volumes
12th	1900	Paris, France	Proceedings published in one volume
13th	1906	Monaco	Proceedings published in one volume
14th	1912	Geneva, Switzerland	Proceedings published in two volumes
