= International Comparative Literature Association =

International research organization

- Formation: 1954; 72 years ago
- Founded at: Oxford, England
- President: Zhang Longxi
- Editor: Marc Maufort
- Affiliations: International Federation for Modern Languages and Literatures
- Website: www.ailc-icla.org

The International Comparative Literature Association (ICLA) (French: Association Internationale de Littérature Comparée—AILC) is an international organization for research in comparative literature.

Founded in 1954, ICLA promotes the study of literature from an international point of view. It organizes international congresses every three years.

== History ==
ICLA was founded in Oxford, UK in 1954 in connection with the 6th Congress of the International Federation for Modern Languages and Literatures (FILLM).

== Balakian Prize ==
In 2004, ICLA and the Anna Balakian Foundation, established the Anna Balakian Prize to promote scholarly research by younger comparatists. The first prize winner was announced in 2007 in the XVIIIth Congress of the ICLA AILC in Rio de Janeiro. Past recipients of the Balakian Prize are:

- 2007 (in Rio de Janeiro, Brazil) Line Henriksen. Ambition and Anxiety: Ezra Pound's Cantos and Derek Walcott's Omeros as Twentieth-Century Epics (New York: Rodopi, 2006).
- 2010 (in Seoul, South Korea)
  - Karen L. Thornber. Empire of Texts in Motion: Chinese, Korean, and Taiwanese Transculturations of Japanese Literature (Cambridge, MA: Harvard-Yenching Institute Monograph Series, 2009).
  - Hans-Joachim Backe. Stukturen und Funktionen des Erzählens im Computerspiel: Eine typologische Einführung (Würzburg: Königshausen & Neumann, 2008).
- 2013 (in Paris, France)
  - Aurélia Hetzel. La reine de Saba: Des Traditions au mythe littéraire (Paris: Classiques Garnier, 2012). (top honour)
  - Shun-liang Chao. Rethinking the Concept of the Grotesque: Crashaw, Baudelaire, Magritte (Oxford: Legenda/Routledge, 2010). (honourable mention)
- 2016 (in Vienna, Austria) Alexandra Berlina. Brodsky Translating Brodsky: Poetry in Self-Translation. (London: Bloomsbury Academic, 2014)
- 2019 (in Macau, China)
  - Shuangyi Li. Proust, China and Intertextual Engagement: Translation and Transcultural Dialogue. (London: Palgrave, 2017) (top honour)
  - Maya Boutaghou. Occidentalismes, romans historiques postcoloniaux et identités nationales au XIXe siècle : Juan Antonio Mateos, Bankim Chandra Chatterjee, Markus Clarke, Jurji Zaydan. (Paris: Honoré Champion éditeur, 2016) (honourable mention)

== Affiliation ==
The ICLA is a member of the International Federation for Modern Languages and Literatures (FILLM).
