= Geoethics =

Geoethics is the branch of ethics which relates to the interaction of human activity with our physical world in general, and with the practice of the Earth sciences in particular. It may also have relevance to planetary sciences. It is described as an emerging scientific and philosophical discipline, consisting of research and reflection on the values that serve as the bases of behaviors and practices wherever human activities interact with the Earth system. Moreover, geoethics promotes the ethical and social roles of geoscientists in conducting scientific and technological research and practice.

For these reasons, geoethics pursues recognition of humankind's duties and responsibility towards the Earth system. A more specialized use emerged as the term came to deal with the ethical, social, and cultural implications of the behavior and professional activities of geoscientists. Some scholars also cited that it provides a point of intersection for geosciences, sociology, economics and philosophy.

The International Association for Promoting Geoethics, included in the international geoethics infrastructure together with the IUGS Commission on Geoethics and the CIPSH Chair on Geoethics(Chair holder in 2026 is Silvia Peppoloni), is the leading organization that is carrying out studies to develop the geoethical thought and to promote geoethics outcomes worldwide.
