= Žarana Papić =

- Born: 4 July 1949; Sarajevo, Yugoslavia
- Died: 10 September 2002 (aged 53); Belgrade, Serbia
- Education: University of Belgrade
- Awards: Chevalier dans l'Ordre des Palmes Académiques
- Scientific career
- Fields: Social anthropology
- Thesis: The Dialectics of Sex and Gender—Nature and Culture in Contemporary Social Anthropology (Dijalektika pola i roda—priroda i kultura u savremenoj socijalnoj antropologiji) (1995)

Žarana Papić (4 July 1949 – 10 September 2002) was a Yugoslav social anthropologist and feminist theorist.

== Life ==
Žarana Papić was born in Sarajevo, Yugoslavia, nowadays Bosnia and Herzegovina on 4 July 1949, and her family moved to Belgrade in 1955. She earned her B.A. degree in sociology from the University of Belgrade in 1974 and received her M.A. degree a dozen years later from the same institution. Papić was appointed a lecturer in social anthropology at the university in 1989 and received her Ph.D. there in 1995. She died unexpectedly in Belgrade on 10 September 2002.

== Activities ==
Already a student activist, Papić was introduced to feminist theory at the Croatian Sociological Association Conference in 1976 and then attended the first Women's Studies course at the Inter-University Centre in Dubrovnik, Croatia, later that year. She began publishing papers on women's issues in 1977 and helped to organize the first international feminist conference in Eastern Europe under the title of Comrade/ess—the woman question, a new approach? (Drug/ca žensko pitanje, novi pristup?) in October 1978 in Belgrade. This was a "key moment in Yugoslav feminism" as it presented the new feminist movement and feminist theory via lectures by prominent feminists from all over Europe.

Papić, with Lydia Sklevicky, co-edited the first book of feminist anthropology in Yugoslavia in 1983, entitled Towards an Anthropology of Woman (Antropologija žene), and her master's thesis was published in 1989 as Sociology and feminism (Sociologija i feminizam). Her doctoral dissertation was published in 1997 as Gender and Culture: Body and Knowledge in Contemporary Anthropology (Polnost i kultura: telo i znanje u savremenoj antropologiji).
