= National character =

Common personality characteristics of a nation

National character refers to a characteristic common personality of the people of a nation. National character has been studied within the fields of anthropology, sociology, and psychology. The question of whether analysis and descriptions of national characters express meaningful content, as opposed to comprising inaccurate stereotypes, is controversial. Most of the research on national character has focused on the content, stability, accuracy, and origins of national character stereotypes. A 1985 cross-national study of national character found fundamental differences between the psychological profiles of the respective national populations of France, Germany, Great Britain, Italy, Russia, and the United States. Some studies comparing national character stereotypes with assessed personality traits find a moderate relationship between stereotype and reality, while others have found perceptions of national character to be unfounded and poorly related. Academic interest in national character peaked around World War II, with two anthropologists in 1969 identifying 1935 to 1945 as the field's seminal period, and declined in the decades that followed due to changes in academic thought. Jerome Braun wrote in 2014 that "the study of national character nowadays is considered somewhat old-fashioned because the most famous period devoted to this study, the period immediately after World War II, eventually reached a point of exhaustion, intellectual and otherwise, as studies were attacked for superfic and bias on the part of the researchers."

== See also ==
- Imagology
- National identity
