= International Union of Prehistoric and Protohistoric Sciences =

- Union internationale des sciences préhistoriques et protohistoriques
- Logo of the International Union of Prehistoric and Protohistoric Sciences
- Abbreviation: UISPP
- Predecessor: International Congress of Anthropology and Prehistoric Archaeology
- Formation: 1931
- Founded at: Bern
- Headquarters: Paris
- Fields: Archaeology, Prehistory, Protohistory
- President: Jacek Kabaciński (since 2024)
- Vice-Presidents: Abdulaye Camara (since 2017), Erika Robrahn González (since 2018)
- General Secretary: Dirk Brandherm (since 2023)
- Treasurer: Éva David (since 2023)
- Secessions: World Archaeological Congress
- Affiliations: International Council for Philosophy and Human Sciences, International Union of Academies
- Website: www.uispp.org
- Formerly called: International Congress of Prehistoric and Protohistoric Sciences

The International Union of Prehistoric and Protohistoric Sciences (Union internationale des sciences préhistoriques et protohistoriques – UISPP) is a learned society, linked through the International Council for Philosophy and Human Sciences to UNESCO, and concerned with the study of prehistory and protohistory. In the words of its constitution:

The UISPP is committed to promote prehistoric and protohistoric studies by the organisation of world congresses, through the creation of scientific commissions dedicated to specific themes, by supporting excavations of international significance, scholarly publications of international scope, conferences or any other learned meeting.

The UISPP, as an international association of scholars, is founded on the principle of the universality of science. It firmly upholds academic freedom, recognizing that the study of humanity is relevant to all contemporary societies. In this spirit, the UISPP staunchly opposes any form of discrimination, whether based on race, creed, philosophical or ideological beliefs, ethnic or geographical background, nationality, gender, language, or any other criteria. Such discrimination, rooted in intolerance, inherently contradicts the scientific approach.

Furthermore, the UISPP rejects attempts to fictionally rewrite history or engage in negationism. As a non-governmental organization, it welcomes all bona fide scholars to participate in its scientific activities, regardless of their background or affiliations. This inclusive approach reflects the UISPP's commitment to fostering a diverse and open academic community dedicated to the advancement of knowledge about human prehistory and protohistory.

== History ==
The origins of the UISPP lie in an 1865 meeting of the Società italiana di scienze naturali (Italian Society of Natural Science) that led to the creation of the Congrès paléoethnologique international (CPI – International Palaeoethnological Congress). The first meeting of the CPI was held in Neuchâtel in 1866. The following year, in Paris, the name was changed to Congrès international d'anthropologie et d'archéologie préhistoriques (CIAAP – International Congress of Anthropology and Prehistoric Archaeology).

A permanent council of the CIAAP was founded in 1880, and regular congresses continued to be held until the outbreak of World War I disrupted the regular scholarly meetings, causing a hiatus in international academic collaboration and exchange. In the aftermath of the war, efforts to revive the tradition of regular congresses were spearheaded by the Institut international d'anthropologie (IIA – International Institute of Anthropology). However, this organization's structure and focus proved inadequate for the evolving needs of prehistoric and protohistoric research. The Institut's limited international perspective and the secondary role it assigned to the fields of prehistory and protohistory ultimately led to calls for the establishment of a more specialized body that would more closely continue the tradition of the CIAAP. In response to these calls, the Congrès international des Sciences préhistoriques et protohistoriques (CISPP – International Congress of Prehistoric and Protohistoric Sciences) was formed in 1931, providing a dedicated platform for scholars active in prehistoric and protohistoric studies. This new organization aimed to foster international collaboration and advance research in these specific fields, addressing the gaps left by its predecessor. The creation of CISPP marked a significant step towards a more focused and globally-oriented approach to prehistoric and protohistoric sciences in the interwar period. Congresses were held in London in 1932 and in Oslo in 1936.

However, the rise of fascism and the outbreak of World War II significantly impacted the activities of the CISPP, and the third congress originally planned for 1940 in Budapest had to be cancelled. No major congresses were held between 1936 and 1950, when a concerted effort by scholars from across Europe finally reestablished the tradition of regular international congresses for the prehistoric and protohistoric sciences, with the first post-war congress held in Zurich in 1950. In 1955, the permanent council decided to affiliate the CISPP with a member organisation of UNESCO, the International Council for Philosophy and Human Sciences. This required a change of name, and in 1956 the CISPP became the Union internationale des sciences préhistoriques et protohistoriques (UISPP – International Union for Prehistoric and Protohistoric Sciences). UISPP congresses subsequently emerged as a vital forum for scientific exchange, bridging the divide between scholars from both sides of the Iron Curtain, despite the tensions of the Cold War. This role as a conduit for east–west dialogue was made possible by adhering to the principle of intellectual neutrality, which explicitly does not regard participants as representatives of any state or government. This approach proved key to fostering an environment of open academic discourse, transcending political boundaries and ideological differences. In 2019, UISPP joined the International Union of Academies (UAI – Union académique internationale).

== Structure ==
The structure of the UISPP has changed several times since its foundation, most recently in 2011, when the permanent council was abolished and individual and institutional memberships were introduced, making the organisation more democratic and transforming it into a fully representative body. Membership in the UISPP is open to all bona fide scholars. However, participation in its scientific commissions typically requires researchers to hold a PhD or be pursuing doctoral studies.

=== General Assembly ===
The general assembly comprises all registered UISPP members and convenes during each world congress. It approves motions proposed by the executive eommittee and elects the president, general secretary, and treasurer. Additionally, the general assembly decides on the establishment and dissolution of scientific commissions and makes other significant decisions within the UISPP framework, following consultation with the executive committee.

=== Executive Committee ===
The executive committee comprises the members of the board (president, general secretary, treasurer, vice-president(s)) and the presidents of all UISPP scientific commissions. Working in tandem with the board, its role is to uphold the principles of the UISPP and to oversee the activities of scientific commissions and the broader organization. The executive committee also monitors preparations for the triennial world congress, intervening in its organization only when faced with unexpected events or significant delays in the program proposed by the national organizing committee.

=== Scientific Commissions ===
The primary objective of the UISPP's scientific commissions is to promote and coordinate international research in specific or specialized domains of prehistoric and protohistoric sciences between each world congress. The commissions are organized into six broader categories, although this list is not exhaustive.

- Historiography, methods and theories (history of archaeology, theories and methods in archaeology, scientific methods used in archaeology, e.g. from the natural sciences, applied sciences, biological sciences, social sciences, economic sciences, etc.),
- Culture, economy and environments (specific periods, diachronic themes, regional peculiarities),
- Archaeology of specific environments (deserts, mountains, volcanic areas, coastal areas, islands, etc.),
- Art and culture (all forms of artistic expression during prehistory and protohistory, including rock art and portable art),
- Technology and economy (invention and development of new technologies, raw material exploitation, including scientific techniques for the characterization of archaeomaterials and related processes),
- Archaeology and society (interaction between archaeology and current society, including strategies for heritage management and for scientific research, and addressing public engagement and societal implications of archaeological work).

The principal activities of a scientific commission are:

- The organization of scientific activities (colloquia, sessions, symposia, workshops) during each triennial UISPP world congress and at least once during the inter-congress period in between; the proceedings from these activities are published,
- Holding an annual general meeting of the commission, to plan a programme of activities for the next year and accept the minutes from the previous meeting,
- Producing and distributing an electronic newsletter, at least once a year, for the members of the commission.

== Congresses of the CISPP and UISPP ==
The frequency of UISPP congresses has evolved over time. Initially held every four years, to alternate biannually with the meetings of the International Congress of Anthropological and Ethnological Sciences, another successor organization to the CIAAP, they shifted to a five-year cycle in 1966 following UISPP's affiliation with CIPSH, aligning with UNESCO guidelines. Since 2011, world congresses have been organized triennially, aiming to alternate between Europe and other continents.

I Congress	London, United Kingdom	1–6 August 1932
II Congress	Oslo, Norway	3–8 August 1936
III Congress	Zurich, Switzerland	14–19 August 1950
IV Congress	Madrid, Spain	21–27 April 1954
V Congress	Hamburg, West Germany	24–30 August 1958
VI Congress	Rome, Italy	29 August – 3 September 1962
VII Congress	Prague, Czechoslovakia	21–27 August 1966
VIII Congress	Belgrade, Yugoslavia	9–15 September 1971
IX Congress	Nice, France	13–18 September 1976
X Congress	Mexico City, Mexico	19–24 October 1981
XI Congress	Mainz, West Germany	31 August – 4 September 1987
XII Congress	Bratislava, Czechoslovakia	1–7 September 1991
XIII Congress	Forlì, Italy	8–14 September 1996
XIV Congress	Liège, Belgium	2–8 September 2001
XV Congress	Lisbon, Portugal	4–9 September 2006
XVI Congress	Florianópolis, Brazil	4–10 September 2011
XVII Congress	Burgos, Spain	1–7 September 2014
XVIII Congress	Paris, France	4–9 June 2018
XIX Congress	Meknes, Morocco	2–7 September 2021
XX Congress	Timișoara, Romania	5–9 September 2023
XXI Congress	Poznań, Poland	31 August – 4 September 2026
XXII Congress	Tübingen, Germany	scheduled for 3–8 September 2029

The XI UISPP World Congress was originally to be held in Southampton in 1986. However, the decision of the British organising committee, led by Peter Ucko, to exclude South African and Namibian archaeologists for political reasons, despite the declared opposition of many of them to apartheid and despite that exclusion constituting a violation of UISPP statutes, led the UISPP to withdraw its endorsement of the congress and postpone the XI World Congress until 1987. The British organising committee went ahead with the congress planned for Southampton under the new name of the World Archaeological Congress (WAC). Whereas the majority of UISPP members rejected the split as a division of scholars and an opportunistic move, writing in 1987, Peter Ucko still described the UISPP as:

a dinosaur which continues to seek to manipulate the world situation according to its archaic Western European preconceptions about what is relevant and important and what is not. It does so by devices such as the imposition of white rules and regulations which no one bothers to explain and by the manipulation of bureaucratic procedures.

Despite these initial divides, since 2005 relations between UISPP and WAC have resumed. The UISPP remains focused on prehistoric and protohistoric research, while WAC evolved to focus primarily on politically committed approaches and advocacy. The two organisations therefore have different scopes.

The XVIII World Congress of UISPP was held in Paris in June 2018. Its overarching theme was "Adaptation and sustainability of prehistoric and protohistoric societies confronted with climate change". This major congress formed part of the ongoing refoundation of Humanities led by the International Council for Philosophy and Human Sciences (which includes UISPP) and UNESCO. While all UISPP congresses have a general theme, they remain open to sessions on any other topic, which can be proposed during the general call for sessions.

The XIX UISPP World Congress, originally planned for 2020 in Meknes, was postponed to 2021 due to the COVID-19 pandemic and was ultimately held as a fully virtual event.

UISPP has also adopted an additional format of inter-congress conferences alongside its triennial world congresses: continental congresses focusing on the prehistory and protohistory of specific regions. The first continental inter-congress in this new format was a multi-venue event held in Java, Indonesia, from 27 October to 6 November 2025, under the theme "Asian Prehistory Today: Bridging Science, Heritage and Development".

== UISPP Prizes ==
The UISPP awards several prizes to recognize excellence in archaeology and related sciences. These distinctions aim to acknowledge significant contributions to archaeological research in the fields of prehistory and protohistory, knowledge dissemination, and the promotion of prehistoric and protohistoric heritage. The awards are presented at each UISPP World Congress:

- Honorary Prize
- Award for major long-term archaeological excavation project
- Award for archaeological mediation (public outreach)
- Award for site monograph
- Award for major synthesis or handbook
- Award for outstanding doctoral dissertation

== UISPP Publications ==
In addition to the publication of the proceedings from its congresses, UISPP since the 1950s has been overseeing the publication af a number of international monograph series aimed chiefly at the systematic publication of primary archaeological source material (Inventaria Archaeologica, Prähistorische Bronzefunde, Fiches typlogiques de l'industrie osseuse préhistorique) but also at specific themes of global interest (Human Societies facing Climate Change). UISPP's World Congress proceedings published since 2016 are available in open access via JSTOR. Since 2018, UISPP has also been publishing the peer-reviewed and open access Journal of the International Union of Prehistoric and Protohistoric Sciences / Revue de l'Union Internationale des Sciences Préhistoriques et Protohistoriques (short: UISPP Journal).
