= Caves of Poço Velho =

Neolithic site in Cascais, Portugal

- Grutas do Poço Velho
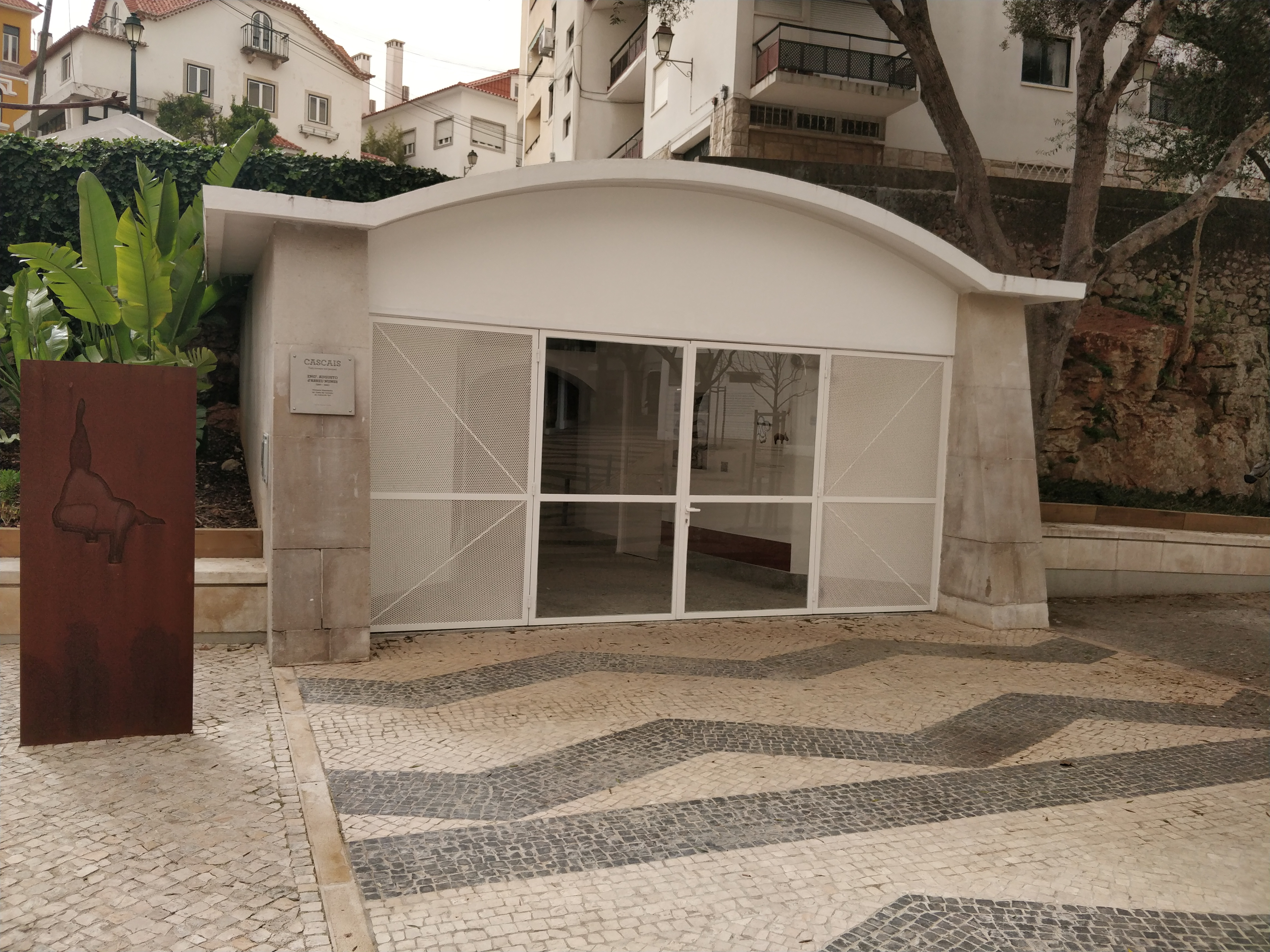
- Entrance to caves
- Interactive map of Caves of Poço Velho
- 38.700°N 9.421°W
- Type: Necropolis
- Periods: Chalcolithic; Neolithic; Paleolithic
- Location: Cascais, Lisbon District, Portugal

Site notes
- Excavation dates: 1879; 1942; 1945-47
- Archaeologists: Carlos Ribeiro; Afonso do Paço; Abreu Nunes
- Condition: Good
- Owner: Municipality of Cascais
- Public access: Yes. By appointment.

The Caves of Poço Velho (old well) are located in the centre of Cascais in the Lisbon district of Portugal. Their use, primarily as a necropolis, is believed to date back to the Paleolithic era.

== Exploration ==
The caves were first explored in 1879 by the geologist, Carlos Ribeiro, considered to be the father of Portuguese archaeology. In 1880, they were visited by members of the IX session of the Congrés Internacional d'Anthropologie et d'Archéologie Préhistoriques (CIAAP) (International Congress of Anthropology and Prehistoric Archaeology), which was being held in Lisbon that year, although it seems that the participants might have been a bit worse for wear on the morning of their visit as they had arrived in Cascais the night before during birthday celebrations for the Prince Royal. At the end of the 1800s another researcher, José Leite de Vascocellos, warned of the state of degradation of the site due to growing pressure from building construction.

Ribeiro believed that he had identified items in the caves dating back to the Paleolithic era. However, subsequent work has found that the main occupation of the caves took place in the Neolithic and Chalcolithic periods (4th and 3rd millennia BC). Evidence points to their use as a necropolis, with around 115 burials having been identified. In 1942, Afonso do Paço carried out the second major exploration of the caves and between 1945 and 1947, the archaeologist, Abreu Nunes, carried out new excavations that discovered different funerary remains, including: polished and chipped stone artefacts; limestone votive offerings, such as cylindrical idols; decorated schist slabs, and ceramics. There are also many items that indicate the proximity of the caves to the sea, such as scallop shells and other univalves and bivalves. During the work of Nunes the cave was cleaned and lighting was installed.

== Visits ==
Some of the items found are on display at the Cascais Town Museum. Others are kept at the National Geological Museum. The caves are rarely open to the public. Special tours can be arranged by contacting the Cascais municipality.

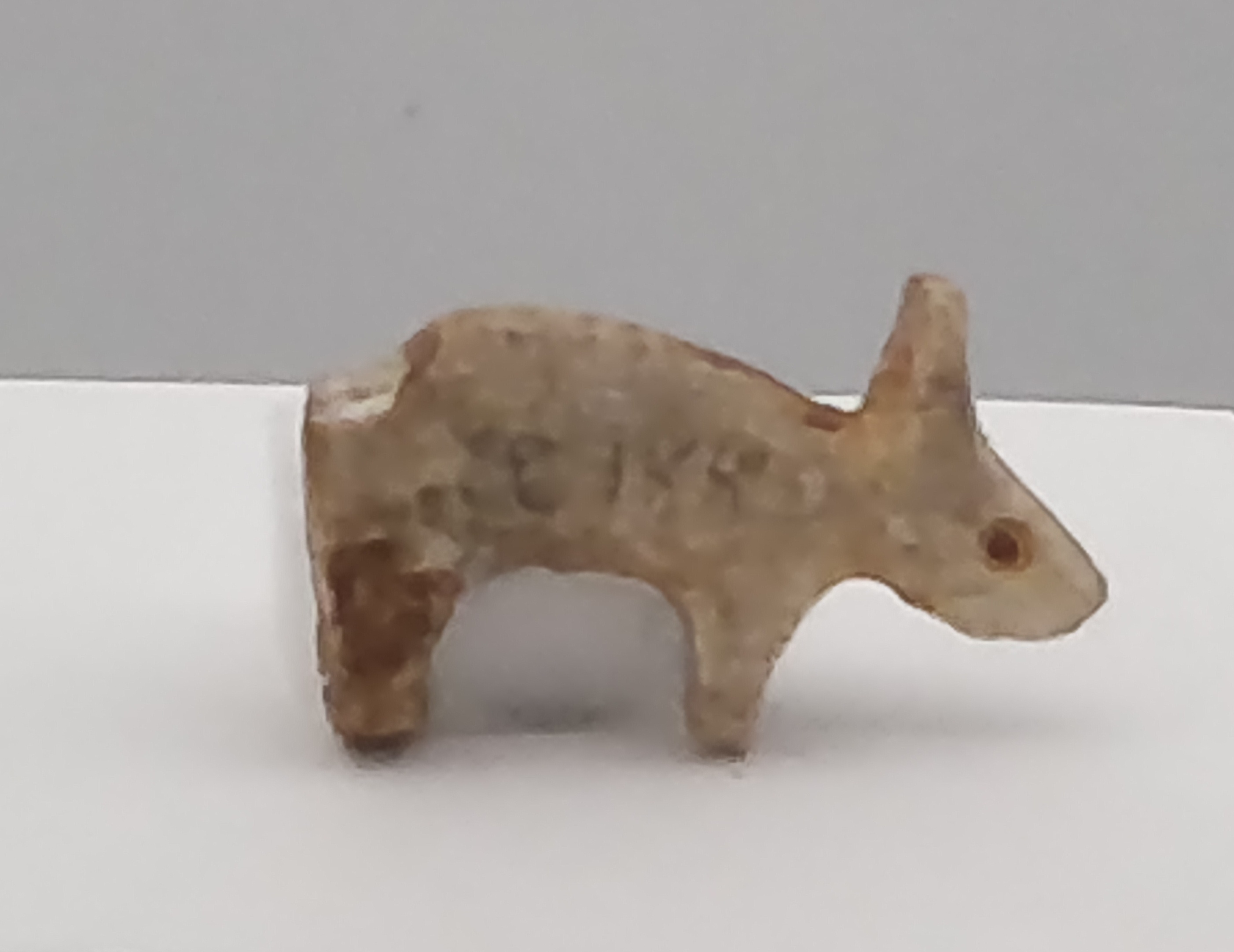
Amulet found in the Poço Velho cave, now in the Cascais museum
