= European Society for the Study of English =

European organization

The ESSE logo

Founded in 1990 in Rome, the European Society for the Study of English (ESSE) is an organization for university teachers and researchers in English Studies, including literature, linguistics, and cultural studies, throughout Europe. It is an association (Verein) conformable to articles 60ff of the Swiss Civil Code (ZGB) with its seat in Basle. Currently, ESSE has 33 national associations and, according to the November 2021 membership lists, there are 7,590 members of ESSE. ESSE is a member of The International Federation for Modern Languages and Literatures (FILLM). As of 2025, the President of ESSE is Prof. Lieven Buysse of KU Leuven, Belgium.

== Activities ==
The activities of ESSE include providing a network for communication between individuals working in English Studies, publication of journals, allocation of bursaries and book prizes to outstanding works in the field of English studies, and organization of regular international conferences. ESSE offers a bursary scheme to help support young academics, and provides book grants to researchers. ESSE also awards prizes to junior and senior scholars for books they wrote in the field of English studies (literature, language, cultural and area studies). ESSE offers financial support for parallel lecture speakers at ESSE conferences and for plenary speakers at national conferences of affiliated national associations. In parallel, ESSE also organises a Doctoral Symposium, open to PhD students who are writing their theses in English Studies.

== Publications ==
ESSE is the editor of a biannual publication which was issued as a newsletter under the name The European English Messenger, in printed format (1990–2015). In 2016 it became an online publication, an academic journal renamed The ESSE Messenger. ESSE also edits The European Journal of English Studies, published by Routledge.

== Conferences ==
The Society holds biennial conferences with approximately 400-700 participants. The ESSE conferences consist of plenary and parallel lectures, seminars, round tables, and other events covering all aspects of English Studies including literature, linguistics and cultural and area studies.
