= Imagology =

Branch of comparative literature

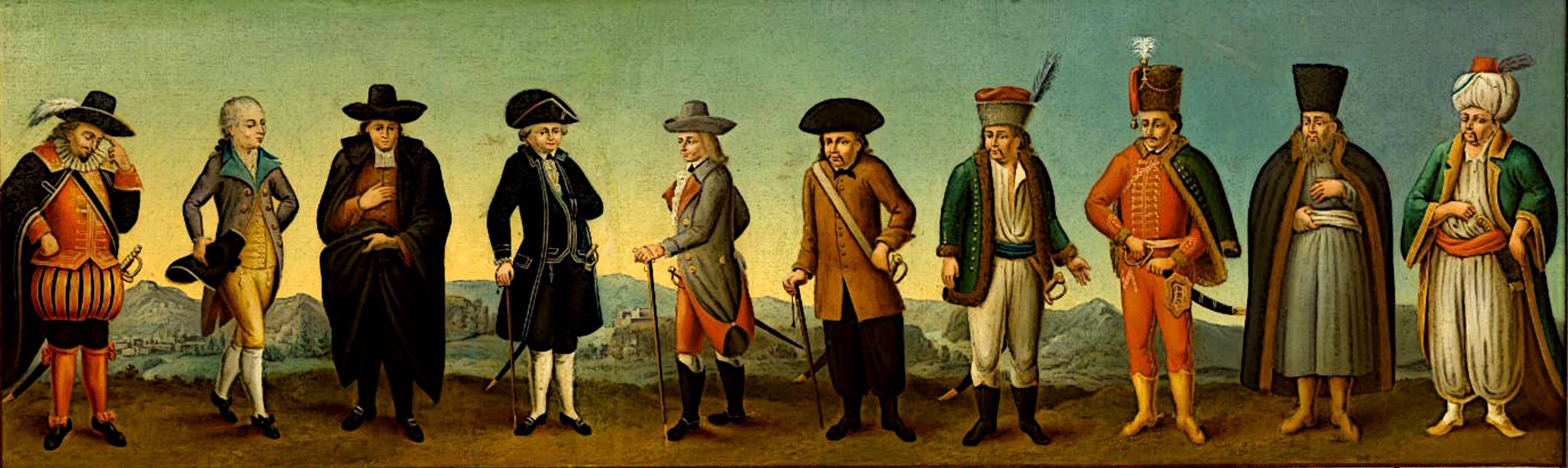

Imagology is a branch of comparative literature. More specifically, it is concerned with "the study of cross-national perceptions and images as expressed in literary discourse". While it adopts a constructivist perspective on national stereotypes and national character, it does emphasize that these stereotypes may have real social effects. It was developed in the 1950s with practitioners in France, the Netherlands, Belgium and Germany. It never gained much of a foothold in anglophone academia. This may be attributed to imagology's skewed relationship to Edward Said's influential Orientalism, which is much better known in this context.

== History ==
National stereotypes were long seen as intrinsic properties of ethnic groups. Hippolyte Taine is a major representative of this positivist view. In his Histoire de la littérature anglaise (1863) he held that cultural artefacts are determined by three factors: "moment", "milieu" and "race". The voluntarist view of what it means to belong to a nation was expressed by Ernest Renan in his lecture "Qu'est-ce qu'une nation?" (What is a nation?) in 1882. Renan argues that citizens may choose to affiliate themselves to a particular nation. Joep Leerssen terms this view proto-imagological, because national identity was still held to be an independently existing entity.

Imagology as the study of literary representations of national or characteristic stereotypes emerged from the French school of comparative literature. The scholars who founded the Revue de la littérature comparée in 1921 (Paul van Tieghem, Fernand Baldensperger, Paul Hazard) had an historical interest in literature and wanted to go beyond the study of national images as if they were historical facts. Marius-François Guyard dedicated a whole chapter to the subject: "L'étranger tel qu'on le voit" ("The outsider as he is viewed"), in his book La Littérature comparée (1951), which analyses novels that represent nations other than the authors' own. As the title already suggests, Guyard did not assume that these images reflected national essences, but rather treated them as representations. This shift from essences to representations makes Guyard a founding father of imagology, which is premised on the assumption that "the images which one studies are seen as properties of texts, as the intellectual produce of a discourse". René Wellek, a leading figure in US comparative literature, contested Guyard's inclusion of imagology in the study of comparative literature, arguing that the study of cross-national images should not become part of comparative literature, for this would turn it into an auxiliary discipline to International relations. A rift between the American and French schools of comparative literature ensued, which limited the international action-radius of imagology.

== Theoretical assumptions ==
Imagologists call the representation of national stereotypes "ethnotypes". Those ethnotypes are regarded as discursive objects rather than objectively existing phenomena. They are always defined against an "other", generating an opposition between auto-images and hetero-images. An auto-image is the representation of the self, while a hetero-image is the representation of the other. These representations stress difference, in keeping with the assumption that "a nation is most characteristically itself in precisely those aspects in which it is most different from others". In ethnotyping, national character serves as an explanatory factor for the behaviour of the actors in literary representations. Oppositional patterns such as North-South, East-West or Centre-Periphery with their concomitant stereotypes serve to contrast nations, regions or continents to each other. In this multi-scalar logic, the same location can be the Centre to one Other and the Periphery to another Other. These representations are changing over time, depending on multiple factors, such as the political and social climate and literary trends.

== Method ==
Since imagology studies literary representations and not societies as such, it is a methodology for the humanities, not for social sciences. Following the theoretical assumption that ethnotypes are not measurable against an objective reality, the research focus is not on the truth-value of a representation but rather on its representation-value. Concretely, this means that imagological research can never raise the question of whether author A has correctly represented nation B, because national character for imagologists is non-existent outside of the literary construction. Rather, imagological research inquires into the development, construction or effects of auto-images, hetero-images or meta-images that authors creates in their work. A meta-image is the image an author writing from nation A about nation B attributes to the view of nation B on nation A. Furthermore, it is of interest to see how ethnotypes have influenced each other in comparing nationalities, time periods or genres.

Imagological analysis investigates the intertextual, contextual and textual aspects of ethnotypes.

The intertext of an ethnotype is established through researching literary representations of the same nation in the same time period. The rationale is to investigate influences of the existing body of literary representations of a nation on the case under study. This can lead to the examination of whether a literary representation of a specific nation has changed over time. For instance, ethnotypes were traditionally often portrayed in sharply contrasting binary terms. In the late-19th century, authors increasingly used ambiguity and irony in their representations, to make them more nuanced. The contextual dimension targets the historical, social, political and economic background in which the text was written, since it is assumed that the author's immediate environment influences his/her representations. War between two countries, for instance, will most probably impart negative connotations to their mutual ethnotypes, while nationalism tends to reinforce the political instrumentalization of auto-images. The textual dimension of imagological analysis examines the text as such, focusing on genre conventions and rhetorical strategies.

== Main works ==
Some of the key pieces to understand the methodology of imagology are compiled on the imagologica website.

- Guyard, Marius-Francois (1951). La Littérature comparée (in French). Presses Universitaires de France.
- Dyserinck, Hugo (1966). "Zum Problem der «images» und «mirages» und ihrer Untersuchung im Rahmen der Vergleichenden Literaturwissenschaft". Arcadia (in German). 1: 107–120.
- Beller, Manfred, and Joep Leerssen (2007). Imagology : The Cultural Construction and Literary Representation of National Characters : A Critical Survey. Studia Imagologica, 13. Amsterdam: Rodopi.
- Joep Leerssen (2016). "Imagology: On using ethnicity to make sense of the world" (PDF). Imagologica.
- Katharina Edtstadler, Sandra Folie, and Gianna Zocco (2022) (eds.): New Perspectives on Imagology. Leiden/Boston: Brill.
