= Lydia Sklevicky =

Croatian feminist (1952–1990)

- Born: 7 May 1952; Zagreb, PR Croatia, FPR Yugoslavia
- Died: 21 January 1990 (aged 37); Delnice, SR Croatia, SFR Yugoslavia
- Education: University of Zagreb
- Occupations: Feminist theorist, historian and sociologist

Lydia Sklevicky (7 May 1952 – 21 January 1990) was a Croatian feminist theorist, historian and sociologist. Sklevicky was "the first Croatian scholar to address the social history of women from a feminist perspective." Her "contribution to the disciplines of history, sociology and anthropology was unique—in many respects unrivalled today—as was her contribution to feminism."

== Life ==
Lydia Sklevicky was born in Zagreb, Yugoslavia (now Croatia) on 7 May 1952. She graduated from the University of Zagreb in 1976 with a double major of sociology and ethnology and subsequently worked for the Institute for the History of the Workers' Movement in Croatia. She gave birth to a daughter in 1978. Sklevicky received her M.A. from Zagreb in the sociology of culture in 1984.

She was killed in an automobile accident in Delnice, Croatia, on 21 January 1990.

== Activities ==
Sklevicky coordinated the first feminist meetings in Zagreb in the late 1970s and was one of the founders of the group Women and Society (Croatian: Žena i društvo) in 1979. She served as the group's coordinator in 1982–83 and later volunteered for the Zagreb-based SOS Hotline for abused women and children.

With Žarana Papić, she co-edited the first book of feminist anthropology in Yugoslavia in 1983, entitled Towards an Anthropology of Woman (Antropologija žene). In the late 1980s she was a columnist for the women's magazine World (Croatian: Svijet), addressing "numerous topics including abortion, the female body, witches and ‘respectable’ feminists."

A posthumous collection of her work, including her unfinished Ph.D. dissertation, Emancipation and Organization: The Antifascist Women’s Front and Post-revolutionary Social Change. (People’s Republic of Croatia 1945–1953) (Croatian: Emancipacija i organizacija, Uloga Antifašističke fronte žena u postrevolucionarnim mijenama društva (NR Hrvatska 1945–1953)), was published in 1996 in Horses, Women, Wars (Croatian: Konji, žene, ratovi).
