= International Union of Anthropological and Ethnological Sciences =

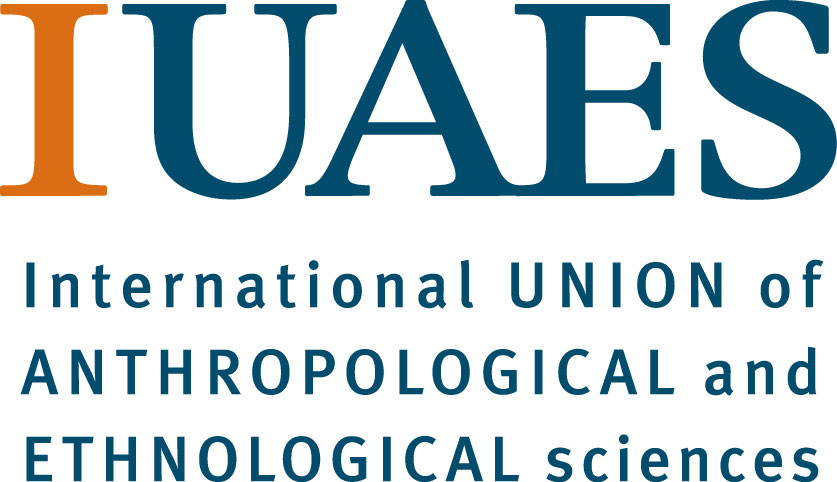
- Abbreviation: IUAES
- Formation: 1948; 78 years ago
- Type: INGO
- Region served: Worldwide
- Official language: English
- President: Isaac K. Nyamongo
- Secretary-General: Virginia R. Domínguez
- Website: IUAES Official website

The International Union of Anthropological and Ethnological Sciences (IUAES) is the largest world forum of anthropologists and ethnologists, with members from more than fifty countries. Every five years, in different parts of the world, the IUAES sponsors a major Congress (ICAES/World Congress), gathering researchers from all of the various subfields and branches of anthropology. The IUAES was founded under the auspices of UNESCO in 1948. The International Congress of Anthropological and Ethnological Sciences (ICAES) had been separately founded in London in 1934. The two organizations united in 1948 and merged officially in 1968. In 2018, IUAES became one of the chambers of the newly established World Anthropological Union (WAU). The main objective of the IUAES is the internationalization of anthropology, and the cross-cultural honing and public dissemination of anthropological research perspectives.

== History ==
The earliest predecessor of the IUAES was the International Congress of Anthropology and Prehistoric Archaeology, which was founded in La Spezia, Italy, in 1865. In 1931, in Basle, Switzerland, it was decided to split the congress into two sections, one for the Anthropological and Ethnological Sciences and one for the Prehistoric and Protohistoric Sciences. This is how the ICAES was born, becoming operative in 1934, when it held its first meeting in London, UK. Meetings were scheduled for every four years, to alternate with those of its sister organization, the International Union of Prehistoric and Protohistoric Sciences, but only one more congress was held, in Copenhagen, Denmark, in 1938, before World War II made it impossible for people to convene. It took ten years before the next congress was held, in 1948, in Brussels, Belgium. Here a special committee was established to be concerned solely with anthropological interests and this became the IUAES. It was formed under the aegis of UNESCO and became a member of the International Council for Philosophy and Human Sciences (ICPHS), which it remains to this day.

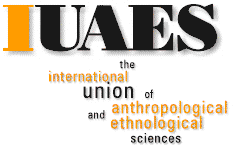
International Union of Anthropological and Ethnological Sciences (IUAES).

The four-year congress cycle continued with meetings in Vienna (1952), Philadelphia (1956), Paris (1960) and Moscow (1964). Up to this point the IUAES remained separate from the ICAES, and was presided over by different people until Henri Vallois took over both presidencies in 1956. Just four years prior to this, in 1952, the International Social Science Council (ISSC) was founded and the IUAES has been represented in it ever since. By 1964, at the ICAES in Moscow, it was decided that the two organizations be joined de facto. At the following congress, in Tokyo (1968), they were united de jure. At the same congress, it was also decided to change the time interval between congresses from four to five years, scheduling the following congress for 1973 in Chicago. At the subsequent congress, held in New Delhi, India, in 1978, it was proposed to organize inter-congresses. These smaller meetings enable countries which do not have the resources to hold a large-scale congress to participate actively. IUAES Inter-Congresses are held with varied frequency in the five-year interval between congresses. To ensure the financial autonomy of the Union from its congresses, in 1998 it was decided to again separate the presidency of the IUAES from that of each succeeding ICAES. The ICAES scheduled for 2008 in Kunming, China, had to be postponed by one year, and was held in 2009 as the IUAES World Congress. The next World Congress was held in Manchester, UK, in 2013.

== IUAES World Anthropology Congresses ==
1934 - London, UK, presided by The Earl of Onslow (I Congress)

1938 - Copenhagen, Denmark, presided by Thomas Thomsen (II Congress)

1948 - Brussels, Belgium, presided by Ed de Jonghe (III Congress)

1952 - Vienna, Austria, presided by Wilhelm Schmidt (IV Congress)

1956 - Philadelphia, United States, presided by Froelich Rainey (V Congress)

1960 - Paris, France, presided by Henri Victor Vallois (VI Congress)

1964 - Moscow, USSR, presided by Sergey Pavlovich Tolstov (VII Congress)

1968 - Tokyo and Kyoto, Japan, presided by Masao Oka (VIII Congress)

1973 - Chicago, United States, presided by Sol Tax (IX Congress)

1978 - New Delhi, India, presided by Lalita Prasad Vidyarthi (X Congress)

1983 - Quebec City and Vancouver, Canada, presided by Cyril Shirley Belshaw (XI Congress)

1988 - Zagreb, Yugoslavia, presided by Hubert Maver (XII Congress)

1993 - Mexico City, Mexico, presided by Lourdes Arizpe (XIII Congress)

1998 - Williamsburg, Virginia, United States, presided by Vinson H. Sutlive (XIV Congress). Note: The original congress president was Mario Zamora, but he died before this congress began

2003 - Florence, Italy, presided by Brunetto Chiarelli (XV Congress)

2009 - Kunming, China, presided by Jing Jun (XVI Congress). Note: This congress, originally scheduled for July 2008, had a one-year postponement

2013 - Manchester, UK (XVII Congress)

2018 - Florianópolis, Brazil (XVIII Congress)

2023 - New Delhi, India (19th Congress)

== Structure ==
The IUAES has an administrative structure involving three bodies: the General Assembly, the Permanent Council, and the executive committee. The executive committee is the main regulatory body, making policy decisions on behalf of, and subject to the authority of, the Permanent Council. The Permanent Council consists of national delegations empowered to vote on any matters concerning the Union. The votes may follow discussions held at the General Assembly. The latter can also put forward proposals but has no decision-making authority. All policy decisions are implemented by the executive committee. The structural guidelines of the IUAES are given in its Statutes, which have grown from a simple set of rules into an array of constitutional by-laws.

The core officers of the IUAES Executive Committee are the president, the secretary-general and the treasurer, with the secretary-general maintaining all records of the Union and supervising all communications, including the production and dissemination of new IUAES publications (including newsletters and handbooks), as well as the designing and updating of the IUAES website. The rest of the executive committee, that is, the past-president, the vice-presidents (with the president of the following congress acting as an additional vice-president) and the members-at-large, aid in the decision-making process.

The scientific work of the IUAES is carried out by its Commissions, which focus on particular topics of specialized interest. The IUAES Commissions, of which more than thirty are currently recognized, determine their own administrative structure and set of activities, which generally include the organization of panels, workshops, and sessions at the quinquennial ICAES. Some commissions have been in existence for decades, while others have rapidly disbanded. Some commissions have their own websites, organize their own conferences, and sponsor the publication of journals or book series. Groups of commissions sometimes co-sponsor initiatives of common interest, and it is possible for IUAES members to be involved in the work of multiple commissions.

== Mission ==
As stated in Article 3 of its Statutes, posted on the IUAES website, the objectives of the Union are:

- To develop international scientific and professional co-operation (consistent with the Charter of UNESCO) in the fields of anthropology and ethnology, in the broadest sense in which these are understood in different parts of the world, and related disciplines and areas of study;
- To foster the development of scientific and professional institutions internationally and regionally;
- To stimulate scientific and professional co-operation among institutions devoted to relevant fields of knowledge;
- To co-operate with other international organizations, and particularly, though not exclusively, with the International Council for Philosophy and Human Sciences, the International Social Science Council, the International Council of Scientific Unions, and the International Council of Museums;
- To develop appropriate roles for anthropology and ethnology in international inter-disciplinary scientific endeavors;
- To take appropriate steps to meet any other objectives consistent with the international scientific and professional concerns of the membership, as determined by the Permanent Council and the executive committee.

Reaching these objectives requires the internationalization of anthropological practice through cross-cultural exchanges based on inclusive, democratic, and intellectually pluralistic policies. These needs were formally acknowledged under the leadership of Cyril S. Belshaw, president in the period 1978–1983, who sensed that "the mood is to place the Union on an active footing". The IUAES Congresses and Inter-Congresses catalyze this process, which is also facilitated by the development and maintenance of efficient channels of membership-wide communication. Initially, news about the IUAES was disseminated through Current Anthropology, the journal of the Wenner-Gren Foundation, which also supported the IUAES. Starting in 1981, however, Eric Sunderland—the longest serving and one of the most influential IUAES secretaries-general—introduced a newsletter, which he continued to edit and distribute until he moved from his post to become president of the IUAES. Peter J. M. Nas, who became the next secretary-general, continued and expanded the publication of the newsletter and also developed an official website, which rapidly became the central point of contact for the Union.

The Williamsburg Congress of 1998 marked the end of a century of anthropology by highlighting that: "No discipline is more important for teaching people about themselves and others, and how they may live together in the next century, than anthropology". It was also pointed out that: "Anthropology is either truly international or not at all". The IUAES celebrated the 60th anniversary of its founding in 2008.
