= Cathérine Jami =

French historian of mathematics

Catherine Jami (born 1961) is a French historian of mathematics specializing in Chinese mathematics. She is a director of research for the French National Centre for Scientific Research (CNRS), affiliated with the Centre for Studies on Modern and Contemporary China (CECMC) at the School for Advanced Studies in the Social Sciences (EHESS) in Paris. She is the former president of the Association française d’études chinoises and of the International Society for the History of East Asian Science, Technology, and Medicine.

== Education and career ==
From 1980 to 1985, Jami studied mathematics at the École normale supérieure de jeunes filles, earning an agrégation in 1982, a diplôme d'études approfondies in 1984, and a doctorat de troisième cycle in 1985 through the Université Sorbonne Paris Nord. In 1986 she earned a master's degree in Chinese studies at Paris Diderot University. She completed a habilitation in the history of science at Paris Diderot University in 2009.

After teaching in the Institut national des langues et civilisations orientales from 1985 to 1986, she joined the French National Centre for Scientific Research as a researcher in 1986, and became a director of research in 2010. From 1986 to 1998 she was part of the research group on the history of science and technology in China, Korea, and Japan headed by Pierre-Étienne Will, from 1991 to 2009 she was associated with the group for epistemological and historical research on exact sciences and scientific institutions (REHSEIS), and in 2009 (with the rest of the group) she became part of the SPHERE laboratory for sciences, philosophy, and history at Paris Diderot University. She moved to the School for Advanced Studies in the Social Sciences in 2014.

== Recognition ==
Jami served as president of the Association française d’études chinoises from 1996 to 1998, and as president of the International Society for the History of East Asian Science, Technology, and Medicine from 1996 to 1999. She served as Treasurer (2009–2013) and Secretary General (2013–2021) of the Division for History of Science and Technology of the International Union of History and Philosophy of Science and Technology.

She became a corresponding member of the International Academy of the History of Science in 2005, and a full member in 2012.

She has been the first chair of the Standing Committee for Gender Equality in Science (SCGES) from October 2021 to October 2025.

== Books ==
Jami is the author of:

- Les Méthodes rapides pour la trigonométrie et le rapport précis du cercle (1774). Tradition chinoise et apport occidental en mathématiques. [The quick methods for trigonometry and the precise ratio of the circle (1774). Chinese tradition and Western contribution in mathematics.] Collège de France, 1990.
- The Emperor’s New Mathematics: Western Learning and Imperial Authority in China During the Kangxi Reign (1662–1722). Oxford University Press, 2012.

She is also co-editor of many edited volumes and guest editor of special issues of journals.
