= International Council for Philosophy and Human Sciences =

Non-governmental organization within UNESCO

- Abbreviation: CIPSH
- Formation: 1949; 77 years ago
- Type: INGO
- Region served: Worldwide
- Official language: English, French
- President: Luiz Oosterbeek
- Website: CIPSH official website

The International Council for Philosophy and Human Sciences (French: Conseil international de la philosophie et des sciences humaines; ICPHS/CIPSH) is a non-governmental organization within UNESCO. It embraces hundreds of learned societies in the field of philosophy, human sciences and related subjects.

== History ==
CIPSH was founded at a first General Assembly held in January 1949 upon suggestion by Sir Julian Huxley, the first Director-General of UNESCO. The first president was Jacques Rueff.

== Members ==
Acronym	Name	Member since
CIPL	Comité International Permanent des Linguistes	1949
CISH	Comité International des Sciences Historiques	1949
FIEC	Fédération Internationale des Associations d’Études Classiques	1949
FISP	Fédération Internationale des Sociétés de Philosophie	1949
IUAES-WAU	International Union of Anthropological and Ethnological Sciences—World Anthropological Union	1949
UAI	Union Académique Internationale	1949
FILLM	Fédération Internationale des Langues et Littératures Modernes	1951
IAHR	International Association for the History of Religions	1951
UISPP	Union Internationale des Sciences Préhistoriques et Protohistoriques	1955
DHST/IUHPST	Division for History of Science and Technology of the International Union of History and Philosophy of Science	2001
CASS	Chinese Academy of Social Sciences	2014
ANHN	Asian New Humanities Network	2015
APHELEIA	Association Européenne des Humanités pour la Gestion Culturelle Intégrée des Paysages	2015
CHCI	Consortium of Humanities Centers and Institutes	2015
DLMPST/IUHPST	Division for Logic, Methodology and Philosophy of Science and Technology of the International Union of History and Philosophy of Science	2015
IAA	International Association for Aesthetics	2015
IGU	International Geographical Union	2015
ECHIC	European Consortium for Humanities Institutes and Centres	2017
IPPA	International Positive Psychology Association	2017
MAAYA	World Network for Linguistic Diversity	2017
IAPG	International Association for Promoting Geoethics	2017

== Officers ==
The officers of CIPSH are Luiz Oosterbeek (President), Chao Gejin (Past President), Luísa Migliorati (Vice President), Tim Jensen (Vice President), Benedikt Löwe (Vice President), Hsiung Ping-chen (Secretary General), Zoltán Somhegyi (Deputy Secretary General), Jesús de la Villa (Treasurer), Olga Spevak (Deputy Treasurer). Former officers include Rosalind Hackett (Vice President, 2017–2020), Adama Samassékou (Past President, 2017–2020), Catherine Jami (Vice President, 2020–2023), and Margaret Higonnet (Treasurer, 2020–2023).

== Publications & Programmes ==
The CIPHS publishes the journal Diogène/Diogenes in French and English. It was founded in 1952 by Roger Caillois. For many years, Jean d'Ormesson was the Editor-in-Chief. Current Editors-in-Chief are Maurice Aymard and Luca Scarantino. In 2018, CIPSH created the CIPSH Chairs programme, designed to highlight and encourage existing research networks of centres of research in the humanities and to attract greater attention to the humanities worldwide and enhanced recognition of their importance in contemporary society.
