= Silvia Peppoloni =

Geoscientist

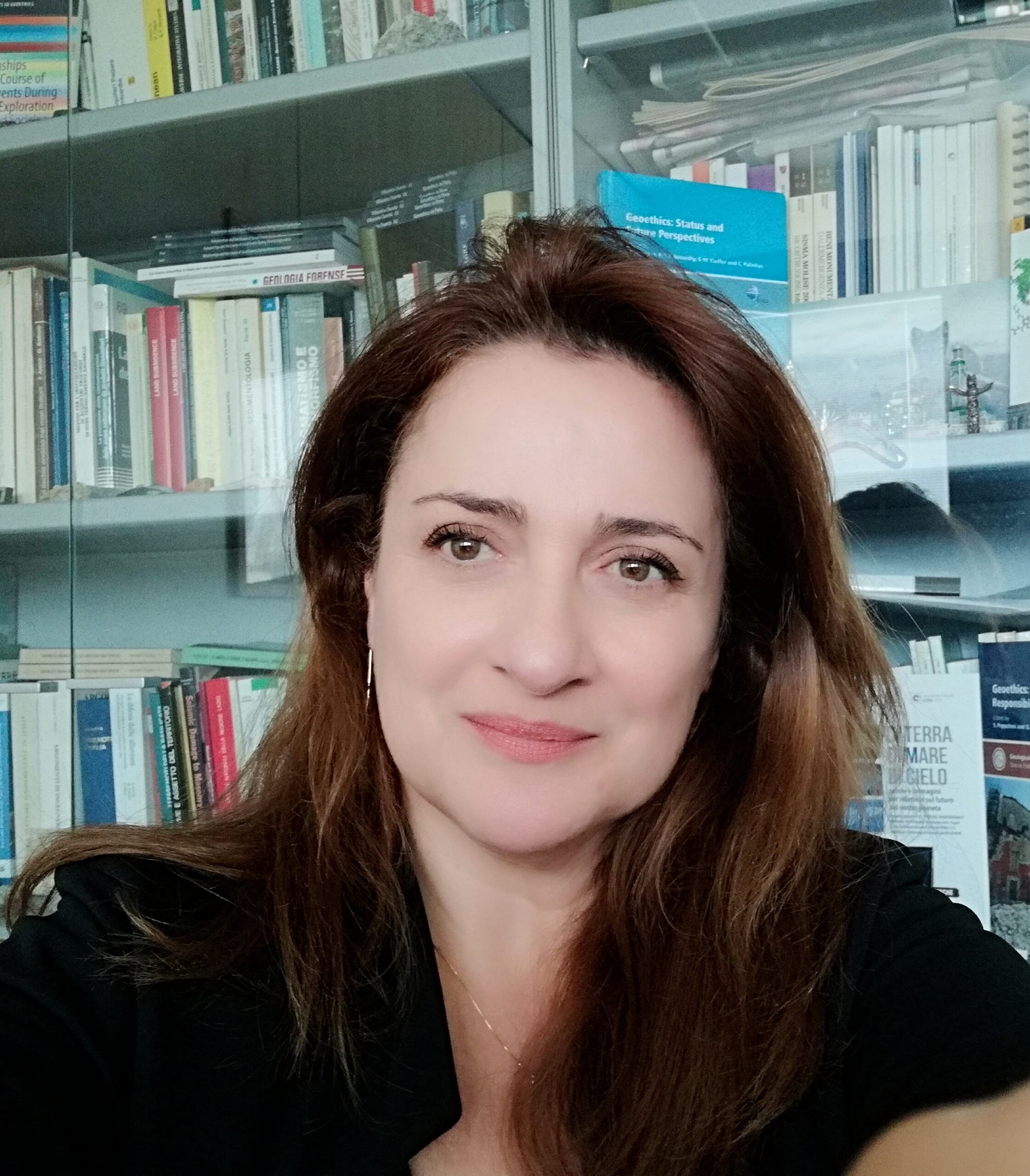
- Occupations: Researcher at the National Institute of Geophysics and Volcanology, Italy
- Known for: Geoethics, Geo-education, Geoscience communication
- Title: PhD in Earth Sciences and Adjunct Professor
- Awards: Distinguished Service Award of the Geological Society of London (2026); Special Award of the Jury – XX Edition of the Italian Prize of Naturalistic Literature "Parco Majella", category: Literary Essays (2017)

Academic background
- Education: Classical Humanities (High School) and Geology (University)
- Alma mater: Sapienza University of Rome, Italy (MS, PhD)

Academic work
- Discipline: Geomorphology

Silvia Peppoloni is an Italian geologist, researcher of natural hazards and risks, science writer, and international scholar in geoethics and social geosciences.

== Early life and education ==
Silvia Peppoloni was born and lives in Rome, Italy. Her interest in geosciences originated from her grandfather's stories about the 1944 eruption of the Vesuvius Volcano. As a child, she attended high school and upper secondary school in Italy.

She won a public competition in polyphonic and symphonic choirs in 1994, becoming a soprano of the youth choir "Luca Marenzio" of the National Academy of S. Cecilia, directed by Norbert Balatsch. From 1995 to 1999, she was the solo singer of the Mediterranean music groups "La Paranza" and "I Tamburi del Vesuvio" di Nando Citarella, and in 2005, of the medieval music group "Symphonia Medioevale".

In 1996, Peppoloni obtained a master's degree in Geosciences from Sapienza University of Rome; in 1997, she obtained professional qualifications and enrolled in the geologists' register. In 2001, she received a PhD in earth sciences. Her initial skills were in geomorphology and tectonics. Subsequently, she focused on engineering geology and its application in the seismic field and seismic microzonation studies and the analysis of local seismic amplification effects. Currently, she works in the field of natural hazards and risks, focusing on aspects of geoscience communication and education.

During her university studies, she cooperated with the Center for Television Applications and Distance Education Techniques of the Sapienza University of Rome to support disabled students with disabilities.

== Career and impact ==
Silvia Peppoloni is a PhD geologist, researcher at the National Institute of Geophysics and Volcanology. Her scientific activities are: natural risks and hazards, geomorphology, engineering geology, and the ethical and social aspects of Earth sciences. She is involved in research on the philosophy of geosciences, social geosciences and geoethics, as well as the practical application of geoethical thinking to geoscience education and communication. She was Professor of Geology and Applied Geology at the Sapienza University of Rome and the Tuscia University between 2008-2011.

She runs a blog entitled "Storie di Gea" Storie di Gea in the online magazine ReWriters, where she's been a writer as well. She has also collaborated with national newspapers such as Corriere della Sera in its cultural supplement "La Lettura", and other magazines such as MicroMega and CiviltàAppennino. She is also invited speaker at events related to inclusion and diversity in geosciences.

Dr Peppoloni is known for her contribution to the definition, development, and promotion of geoethics. She is co-author of the Geoethical Promise, an Hippocratic-like oath for geoscientists, and the Cape Town Statement on Geoethics, a document summarising values, concepts, and contents related to geoethical thinking, translated into 35 languages. She works to create awareness about "the growing impact of human activities on bio-geological systems" and how to promote geoethics as a responsible way of thinking and managing the planet for creating safe and healthy interactions among humans and other biotic and abiotic entities forming the Earth system. Her studies and activities have laid the foundations of geoethics and contributed to developing its theoretical structure and practical applications.

In 2026, She received Distinguished Service Award from the Geological Society of London "for her extraordinary and deeply transformative contribution to the geoscience community, emerging as a leading international figure in the advancement and promotion of geoethics."'

=== Organisations and roles ===
- School on Geoethics and Natural Issues, – Founder and director
- International Association for Promoting Geoethics – Founding member and president
- International Union of Geological Sciences – Chair
- Geoethics of the International Council for Philosophy and Human Sciences – Chairholder
- Ethical Advisory Board of the Integrated Carbon Observation System – Chair
- Italian Geological Society – Councillor
- Standing Committee for Gender Equality in Science of the International Science Council – Member
- Italian section of the International Association for Engineering Geology and the Environment – Member of the executive committee
- Advisory Boards of H2020 European projects (ENVRIplus, EPOS SP, and ENGIE) – Member
- Journal of Geoethics and Social Geosciences – Editor-in-chief
- SpringerBriefs in Geoethics – Editor-in-chief

== Awards and honors ==
- 2026 Distinguished Service Award of the Geological Society of London (GSL)

As a science writer, she received the following awards:

- Special Award of the Jury – XX Edition of the Italian Prize of Naturalistic Literature "Parco Majella" 2017 (Category: Literary Essays)
- Third place in the grand final of the 2016 Italian Award for Science Dissemination category "Mathematical, Physical and Natural Sciences", with the book: Planet Earth (Pianeta Terra" (transl.), Il Mulino, Bologna (Italy)
- Finalist of the Italian Prize for Science Dissemination 2014 (Category: Mathematical, Physical and Natural Sciences)

== Selected works ==
- Peppoloni Silvia and Di Capua Giuseppe (2026). Geoethics: The Role of Geoscientists in Shaping a Responsible Future. Annual Review Earth and Planetary Sciences, 54. https://doi.org/10.1146/annurev-earth-032524-123956.
- Peppoloni Silvia and Di Capua Giuseppe, eds. (2024). Geoethics for the Future: Facing Global Challenges. Elsevier, xxxi+401 pp., ISBN 978-0443156540. https://doi.org/10.1016/C2022-0-00487-6.
- Peppoloni Silvia and Di Capua Giuseppe (2022). Geoethics: Manifesto for an Ethics of Responsibility Towards the Earth. Springer, Cham, XII+123 pp., ISBN 978-3030980436. https://doi.org/10.1007/978-3-030-98044-3.
- Peppoloni Silvia e Di Capua Giuseppe (2021). GEOETICA: manifesto per un'etica della responsabilità verso la Terra. Saggine, n. 346, pp. 224, Donzelli Editore, ISBN 978-8855221696. (in Italian)
- Peppoloni Silvia, Di Capua Giuseppe, Bobrowsky Peter, Cronin Vincent, eds. (2017). Geoethics at the heart of all geoscience. Annals of Geophysics, Vol. 60, Fast Track 7.
- Doglioni Carlo e Peppoloni Silvia (2016). Pianeta Terra. Una storia non finita. Il Mulino, Bologna, pp. 160, ISBN 978-8815263766 (in Italian)
- Wyss, Max; Peppoloni, Silvia (November 13, 2014). Geoethics: Ethical Challenges and Case Studies in Earth Sciences. Elsevier. ISBN 978-0-12-800076-2.
- Peppoloni, Silvia; Di Capua, Giuseppe (August 24, 2015). Geoethics: the Role and Responsibility of Geoscientists. Geological Society of London. ISBN 978-1-86239-726-2.
- Matteucci, Ruggero; Gosso, Guido; Peppoloni, Silvia; Piacente, Sandra; Wasowski, Janusz (September 1, 2014). "The "Geoethical Promise": A Proposal". Episodes. 37 (3): 190–191. doi:10.18814/epiiugs/2014/v37i3/004.
- Peppoloni, Silvia (2014). Convivere con i rischi naturali. Bologna: Il Mulino. ISBN 978-88-15-25078-0. OCLC 898720298. (in Italian)
- Peppoloni, Silvia; Di Capua, Giuseppe (2012). "Geoethics and geological culture: awareness, responsibility and challenges". Annals of Geophysics. 55 (3) 2. doi:10.4401/ag-6099.
