= Diogenes (journal) =

Philosophy and humanities journal from 1953

- Discipline: Philosophy and the Humanities
- Language: English
- Edited by: Luca Maria Scarantino

Publication details
- History: 1953–present
- Publisher: Cambridge University Press on behalf of the International Council for Philosophy and Human Sciences

Standard abbreviations
- ISO 4: Diogenes

Indexing
- ISSN: 0392-1921
- LCCN: 55003452
- OCLC no.: 502380627

Links
- Journal homepage

Diogenes is a peer-reviewed academic journal that publishes papers in the field of philosophy and the humanities owned by the International Council for Philosophy and Human Sciences (CIPSH). It is a platform for scholarly publications with emphasis on transdisciplinary and cross-cultural orientations, and seeks to bring together scholars from different cultures, horizons, and disciplines in the humanities and social sciences. The journal's General Editor is Luca Maria Scarantino. It has been in publication since 1953 and is currently published by Cambridge University Press on behalf of the International Federation of Philosophical Societies (FISP) acting for CIPSH.

== History ==
The journal was created in 1953 by Roger Caillois and has been published since its origin under the auspices of the International Council for Philosophy and Human Sciences, originally with the support of UNESCO. During its history, it was published with issues in many languages, among them French, English, Spanish, Arabic, Japanese, Portuguese, Chinese, and Hindi.

Past editors of Diogenes were Roger Caillois, Comte Jean d'Ormesson, Paola Costa Giovangigli (until 2004), and Maurice Aymard and Luca Scarantino (from 2005). Before 2022, the English edition of Diogenes was published by SAGE Publications and the French version under the name Diogène by Presses Universitaires de France (PUF). Until no. 252 of the French edition and volume 63 of the English edition, the content of the two editions was translations of each other. After 2016, the content diverged. The last volume published by Sage was volume 64 (2017). According to a Memorandum of Agreement, FISP took responsibility for the publication of the journal from 2021 to 2024. During this period, the publisher of the English edition of the journal was changed and volume 65 (2024) was published by Cambridge University Press. The French edition, managed by Nicole Albert, continues to be published by PUF. In 2022, the French edition published a 70th anniversary double issue entitled Soixante-Dix Ans. 1952–2022.

== Scope ==
Diogenes aims to offer a publication outlet for scientific information and intellectual synthesis. The journal publishes work from all fields of philosophical, humanistic and social studies from archaeology to education. Diogenes is transdisciplinary in scope, publishing pieces by scholars across a range of disciplines.

== Abstracting and indexing ==
Diogenes is abstracted and indexed in the following databases:

- Academic Premier
- Arts & Humanities Citation Index
- Current Contents: Arts & Humanities
- Humanities Index
- Periodicals Content Index
- SCOPUS
