= European Journal of English Studies =

- Discipline: English language, English literature
- Language: English
- Edited by: Frederik van Dam, Isabela Carrera Suárez, Katerina Kitsi-Mitakou

Publication details
- History: 1997–present
- Publisher: Routledge
- Frequency: Triannually

Standard abbreviations
- ISO 4: Eur. J. Engl. Stud.

Indexing
- ISSN: 1382-5577 (print); 1744-4233 (web)
- OCLC no.: 37135308

Links
- Journal homepage; Online access; Online archive

The European Journal of English Studies is an interdisciplinary peer-reviewed academic journal focusing on English language, literature and culture, established in 1997 and published by Routledge. It is the official journal of the European Society for the Study of English. The current editors-in-chief are Frederik van Dam, Isabela Carrera Suárez, and Katerina Kitsi-Mitakou. The journal appears three times a year and the individual issues are devoted to specific topics proposed by guest editors, e.g.:

- Letters and letter writing
- New Englishes
- Intercultural negotiations

The aim of the journal is to reflect the multicultural perspective characterising the current state of English studies research in Europe, while encouraging dialogue and not avoiding controversial topics.
