= Rineke Verbrugge =

Dutch logician and computer scientist

- Born: 12 March 1965 (age 61); Amsterdam
- Citizenship: Dutch
- Education: University of Amsterdam
- Scientific career
- Fields: Mathematics, Logic, Artificial Intelligence
- Thesis: Efficient Meta-Mathematics (1993)
- Doctoral advisor: Dick de Jongh, Anne Troelstra, Albert Visser

Laurina Christina (Rineke) Verbrugge (born 12 March 1965 in Amsterdam) is a Dutch logician and computer scientist known for her work on interpretability logic and provability logic. She completed her PhD at the University of Amsterdam in 1993 under the supervision of Dick de Jongh, Anne Troelstra, and Albert Visser.

She holds the chair of Logic and Cognition at the University of Groningen's Bernoulli Institute of Mathematics, Computer Science and Artificial Intelligence, where she has been the leader of the Multi-Agent Systems working group since 2002. She is particularly known for her work connecting formal logic to cognition and developmental psychology and the role of logic in explaining social behaviour.

From 2005 to 2021, she was the President (voorzitter) of the Nederlandse Vereniging voor Logica & Wijsbegeerte der Exacte Wetenschappen (VvL; Dutch Association for Logic and Philosophy of the Exact Sciences). In 2021, she was elected a member of the Royal Netherlands Academy of Arts and Sciences (KNAW). Verbrugge is an associate editor of the Journal of Logic, Language and Information.

== Selected publications ==
- Frank Dignum, Barbara Dunin-Keplicz, Rineke Verbrugge, "Agent theory for team formation by dialogue" International Workshop on Agent Theories, Architectures, and Languages (2000: 150–166.
- Frank Dignum, Barbara Dunin-Keplicz, Rineke Verbrugge, "Creating collective intention through dialogue," Logic Journal of the IGPL 9 no. 2 (2001): 289–304.
- Barbara Dunin-Keplicz, Rineke Verbrugge, "Teamwork in multi-agent systems: A formal approach" (Wiley 2011)
- Barbara Dunin-Keplicz, Rineke Verbrugge, "Collective intentions", Fundamenta Informaticae 51 no. 3 (2002): 271–295.
- Liesbeth Flobbe, Rineke Verbrugge, Petra Hendriks, Irene Krämer, "Children's application of theory of mind in reasoning and language", Journal of Logic, Language and Information 17 no. 4 (2008): 417–442.
- Rineke Verbrugge, "Logic and social cognition," Journal of Philosophical Logic 38, no. 6 (2009): 649–680.
- Rineke Verbrugge, "Provability Logic", Stanford Encyclopedia of Philosophy (Fall 2017 Edition), Edward N. Zalta (ed.), URL = <https://plato.stanford.edu/archives/fall2017/entries/logic-provability/>.
