= Michiel Leezenberg =

Michiel Leezenberg (born 1964) is a Dutch scholar in philosophy and Kurdology.

== Work ==
Leezenberg studied classical languages, philosophy, and general linguistics, and in 1995 obtained his PhD under the supervision of Renate Bartsch and Martin Stokhof with a dissertation entitled Contexts of Metaphor. He spent some time in the Middle East, which caused his interest in Kurdish studies. He then returned and published the award-winning Islamic Philosophy (2001), for which received the Socrates Prize. In 2002, he began writing for NRC Handelsblad.

In 2007, Leezenberg became an assistant professor in the Department of Philosophy at the University of Amsterdam. He specializes in Islamic philosophy and the philosophy of Michel Foucault.

In addition to his scholarly works in philosophy, Leezenberg has extensively published in Kurdish studies, especially about classical Kurdish literature.

== Bibliography ==
- Contexts of Metaphor, Elsevier, 2001
- Religion in Kurdistan, Cambridge Press, 2021
