= Graham Priest bibliography =

The following is a list of works by philosopher Graham Priest.

== Books ==
- Priest, Graham; Routley, R. On Paraconsistency Research Report #13, Research School of Social Sciences, Australian National University 1983. Reprinted as the introductory chapters of Paraconsistent Logic, G.Priest, R. Routley and J. Norman (eds.), Philosophia Verlag, 1989. Translated into Romanian as chapters in I. Lucica (ed.), Ex Falso Quodlibet: studii de logica paraconsistenta (in Romanian), Editura Technica, 2004.
- Priest, Graham. Logic: A Very Short Introduction, Oxford University Press, 2000. ISBN 0-19-289320-3 Translated into Portuguese as Lógica para Começar, Temas & Debates, 2002. Translated into Spanish as Una Brevísima Introducción a la Lógica, Oceano, 2006. Translated into Czech, as Logika – průvodce pro každého, Dokořán, 2007. Translated into Persian by Bahram Asadian, 2007. Translated into Japanese, Iwanami Shoten, 2008.
- Priest, Graham; van Bendegem, Jean Paul; Batens, Diderik; Mortensen, Chris (2000). Frontiers of paraconsistent logic. Baldock, Hertfordshire, England Philadelphia, Pennsylvania: Research Studies Press. ISBN 9780863802539.
- Priest, Graham. Introduction to Non-Classical Logic, Cambridge University Press, 2001. 2nd edition: Introduction to Non-Classical Logic: From If to Is, Cambridge University Press, 2008. ISBN 978-0-521-67026-5 German translation of Part 1 of Introduction to Non-Classical Logic: From If to Is: Einführung in die nicht-klassische Logik, Mentis 2008.
- Priest, Graham. Beyond the Limits of Thought, Cambridge University Press, 1995. 2nd edition, Oxford University Press, 2002. ISBN 0-19-924421-9
- Priest, Graham. Towards Non-Being: the Semantics and Metaphysics of Intentionality, Oxford University Press, 2005. ISBN 0-19-926254-3
- Priest, Graham. In Contradiction: A Study of the Transconsistent, Martinus Nijhoff, 1987. Second edition Oxford University Press, 2006. ISBN 0-19-926330-2
- Priest, Graham. Doubt Truth to be a Liar, Oxford University Press, 2006. ISBN 0-19-926328-0
- Priest, Graham. Logic: A Brief Insight, Sterling 2010. ISBN 1-4027-6896-6
- Priest, Graham. One: Being an Investigation into the Unity of Reality and of its Parts, including the Singular Object which is Nothingness, Oxford University Press, 2014. ISBN 978-0-19-968825-8
- Priest, Graham. 2018. The Fifth Corner of Four: An Essay on Buddhist Metaphysics and the Catuṣkoṭi. Oxford: Oxford University Press. ISBN 978-0-19-875871-6
- Deguchi, Yasuo, Jay L. Garfield, Graham Priest, and Robert H. Sharf. 2021. What Can't Be Said: Paradox and Contradiction in East Asian Thought. New York: Oxford University Press. ISBN 978-0-19-752618-7
- Priest, Graham. 2021. Capitalism: Its Nature and Its Replacement: Buddhist and Marxist Insights. Routledge. ISBN 9781032049106

== Articles ==
- — (September 1976). "Gruesome Simplicity". Philosophy of Science. 43 (3): 432–7. doi:10.1086/288698. JSTOR 187236. S2CID 224832137.
- — (1976). "Modality as a Metaconcept". Notre Dame J. Formal Logic. 17 (3): 401–414. doi:10.1305/ndjfl/1093887632. MR 0446907. Zbl 0212.01303.
- —; Read, S. (1977). "The Formalization of Ockham's Theory of Supposition". Mind. LXXXVI (341): 109–113. doi:10.1093/mind/LXXXVI.341.109.
- — (1977). "A Refoundation of Modal Logic". Notre Dame J. Formal Logic. 18 (3): 340–354. doi:10.1305/ndjfl/1093888007. MR 0505278. Zbl 0348.02025.
- — (January 1979). "Logic of Paradox". Journal of Philosophical Logic. 8 (1): 219–241. doi:10.1007/BF00258428. JSTOR 30227165. S2CID 35042223. Translated into French as 'La Logique du Paradoxe', Philosophie 94 (2007), 72–94.
- — (1979). "Indefinite Descriptions". Logique et Analyse. 22: 5–21.
- — (March 1979). "A Note on the Sorites paradox". Australasian Journal of Philosophy. 57 (1): 74–75. doi:10.1080/00048407912341061.
- — (1979). "Two Dogmas of Quineanism". Philosophical Quarterly. 29 (117): 289–301. doi:10.2307/2219445. JSTOR 2219445.
- — (November 1980). "Sense, Entailment and Modus Ponens". Journal of Philosophical Logic. 9 (4): 415–435. doi:10.1007/BF00262864. S2CID 8630348.
- —; Read, S. (1980). "Merely Confused Supposition: A Theoretical Advance or a Mere Confusion". Franciscan Studies. 40: 265–297. doi:10.1353/frc.1980.0009. S2CID 170810563.
- —; Read, S. (1981). "Ockham's Rejection of Ampliation". Mind. XC (358): 274–9. doi:10.1093/mind/XC.358.274.
- — (December 1981). "The argument from design". Australasian Journal of Philosophy. 59 (4): 422–431. doi:10.1080/00048408112340371.
- — (1983). "The Logical Paradoxes and the Law of Excluded Middle". Philosophical Quarterly. 33 (131): 160–5. doi:10.2307/2218742. JSTOR 2218742.
- — (1982). "To be and not to be: Dialectical Tense Logic". Studia Logica. 41 (2–3): 249–268. doi:10.1007/BF00370347. S2CID 120390523. translated into Bulgarian and reprinted in Filosofska Missal XL(8), 1984, 63–76.
- —; Routley, R. (1982). "Lessons from Pseudo-Scotus". Philosophical Studies. 42 (2): 189–199. doi:10.1007/BF00374033. S2CID 170570445.
- —; Mortensen, C. (1981). "The Truth Teller Paradox". Logique et Analyse: 95–6, 381–8.
- — (1983). "An Anti-Realist Account of Mathematical Truth". Synthese. 57: 49–65. doi:10.1007/BF01064067. S2CID 46953147. Reprinted as ch. 8 of D. Jacquette (ed.) Philosophy of Mathematics, Blackwell, 2002.
- — (May 1984). "Logic of Paradox Revisited". Journal of Philosophical Logic. 13 (2): 153–179. doi:10.1007/BF00453020. S2CID 2442524.
- — (1984). "Semantic Closure". Studia Logica. 43 (1–2): 117–129. doi:10.1007/BF00935745. S2CID 189790752.
- —; Routley, R. (1984). "Introduction: Paraconsistent logics". Studia Logica. 43 (1–2): 3–16. doi:10.1007/BF00935736. S2CID 120411411.
- — (1984). "Hypercontradictions". Logique et Analyse (107): 237–243.
- — (1985). "Hume's Final Argument". History of Philosophy Quarterly. 2: 349–352.
- — (1985). "Contradictions in Motion". American Philosophical Quarterly. 22: 339–346.
- — (1985). "Contradiction, Belief and Rationality". Proc. Aristot. Soc. LXXXVI (6): 99–116.
- — (1986). "Tense and Truth Conditions". Analysis. 46 (4): 162–6. doi:10.1093/analys/46.4.162.
- — (1986). "The Logic of Nuclear Armaments". Critical Philosophy. 3: 107–113.
- 'Unstable Solutions to the Liar Paradox' in Self Reference: Reflections and Reflexivity, S.J. Bartlett and P. Suber (eds.), Nijhoff, 1987.
- — (1987). "Tense, Tense and TENSE". Analysis. 47 (4): 177–9. doi:10.1093/analys/47.4.184.
- 'Reasoning about Truth', Technical Report TR-ARP-2/88, Automated Reasoning Project, Australian National University, 1988.
- 'Consistency by Default', Technical Report TR-ARP-3/88, Automated Reasoning Project, Australian National University, 1988.
- — (1988). "When Inconsistency is Inescapable". South African Journal of Philosophy. 7: 83–89.
- — (1989). "Primary Qualities are Secondary Qualities Too". Br J Philos Sci. 40 (1): 29–37. doi:10.1093/bjps/40.1.29.
- —; Sylvan, R. (1989). "Contradiction, Assertion, and "Frege's Point"". Analysis. 49 (1): 23–6. doi:10.1093/analys/49.1.23.
- — (June 1989). "Reasoning About Truth". Artificial Intelligence. 39 (2): 231–244. doi:10.1016/0004-3702(89)90027-1.
- — (1989). "Denyer's $ not Backed by Sterling Arguments". Mind. XCVIII (390): 265–8. doi:10.1093/mind/XCVIII.390.265.
- 'Classical Logic Aufgehoben' in Paraconsistent Logic, G. Priest, R. Routley and J. Norman (eds.), Philosophia Verlag, 1989.
- 'Reductio ad Absurdum et Modus Tollendo Ponens' in Paraconsistent Logic, G. Priest, R. Routley and J. Norman (eds.), Philosophia Verlag, 1989. Reprinted in Rumanian in I. Lucica (ed.), Ex Falso Quodlibet: studii de logica paraconsistenta (in Romanian), Editura Technica, 2004.
- 'Relevance, Truth and Meaning' (with J. Crosthwaite) in Directions of Relevant Logic, R. Sylvan and J. Norman (eds.), Nijhoff, 1989.
- — (1989). "Gegen Wessel". Philosophische Logik. 2: 109–120.
- — (1990). "Dialectic and Dialetheic". Science & Society. 53: 388–415.
- — (May 1990). "Boolean negation, and all that". Journal of Philosophical Logic. 19 (2): 201–215. doi:10.1007/BF00263541. S2CID 42758842.
- —; McKenzie, J. (1990). "Paraconsistent Dialogues". Logique et Analyse (131–2): 339–57.
- — (1991). "Was Marx a Dialetheist?". Science & Society. 54: 468–475.
- — (1991). "Minimally inconsistent LP". Studia Logica. 50 (2): 321–331. doi:10.1007/BF00370190. S2CID 31032152.
- — (1991). "Intensional Paradoxes". Notre Dame J. Formal Logic. 32 (2): 193–211. doi:10.1305/ndjfl/1093635745. MR 1122994. Zbl 0747.03005.
- — (1991). "The Limits of Thought – and Beyond". Mind. C (399): 361–370. doi:10.1093/mind/C.399.361.
- — (1991). "Sorites and Identity". Logique et Analyse (135–6): 293–6.
- —; Sylvan R (May 1992). "Simplified semantics for basic relevant logics". Journal of Philosophical Logic. 21 (2): 217–232. doi:10.1007/BF00248640. S2CID 43226368.
- — (1992). "On Time". Philosophia. 50: 9–18.
- — (1992). "What is a Non-Normal World?". Logique et Analyse. 35: 291–302.
- — (March 1993). "Another disguise of the same fundamental problems: Barwise and Etchemendy on the liar". Australasian Journal of Philosophy. 71 (1): 60–69. doi:10.1080/00048409312345052.
- — (1993). "Yu and Your Mind". Synthese. 95 (3): 459–460. doi:10.1007/BF01063882. S2CID 46975513.
- — (1993). "Can Contradictions be True?, II". Proc. Aristot. Soc. 67 (Suppl): 35–54.
- — (March 1994). "Derrida and self-reference". Australasian Journal of Philosophy. 72 (1): 103–111. doi:10.1080/00048409412345911.
- — (1994). "The Structure of the Paradoxes of Self-Reference". Mind. 103 (409): 25–34. doi:10.1093/mind/103.409.25.
- — (1994). "Is Arithmetic Consistent?". Mind. 103 (411): 337–349. doi:10.1093/mind/103.411.337.
- — (1994). "What Could the Least Inconsistent Number be?". Logique et Analyse. 37: 3–12.
- 'Goedel's Theorem and Creativity', in Creativity, ed. T Dartnall, Kluwer Academic Publishers, 1994. Reprinted with a different introduction as 'Goedel's Theorem and the Mind... Again', in Philosophy of Mind: the place of philosophy in the study of mind, eds. M.Michaelis and J. O'Leary-Horthorne, Kluwer, 1994.
- — (1995). "Etchemendy and Logical Consequence". Canadian Journal of Philosophy. 25 (2): 283–292. doi:10.1080/00455091.1995.10717416. S2CID 170145892.
- — (1995). "Gaps and Gluts: Reply to Parsons". Canadian Journal of Philosophy. 25: 57–66. doi:10.1080/00455091.1995.10717404. S2CID 170289739.
- — (1995). "Multiple Denotation, Ambiguity and the Strange Case of the Missing Amoeba". Logique et Analyse. 38: 361–73.
- 'Some Priorities of Berkeley', Logic and Reality: Essays on the Legacy of Arthur Prior, ed. B.J.Copeland, Oxford University Press, 1996.
- — (1996). "Everett's Trilogy". Mind. 105 (420): 631–647. doi:10.1093/mind/105.420.631.
- — (1996). "On Inconsistent Arithmetics: Reply to Denyer". Mind. 105 (420): 649–659. doi:10.1093/mind/105.420.649.
- Crosthwaite, J.; Priest, G (March 1996). "The definition of sexual harassment". Australasian Journal of Philosophy. 74 (1): 66–82. doi:10.1080/00048409612347071. Reprinted in G. Lee Bowie and Meredith Michaels (eds.), 13 Questions in Ethics and Social Philosophy, Harcourt, Brace, Jovanovich, 2nd ed., 1997.
- 'Paraconsistent Logic', Encyclopaedia of Mathematics; Supplement, ed. M. Hazenwinkle, Kluwer Academic Publishers, 1997, 400–1.
- 'Logic, Nonstandard', pp. 307–10, Encyclopedia of Philosophy; Supplement, ed. D.Borshert, MacMillan, 1996.
- Paraconsistent Logic' (with K.Tanaka), Stanford Internet Encyclopedia of Philosophy, created 1996.
- — (February 1997). "On a Paradox of Hilbert and Bernays". Journal of Philosophical Logic. 26 (1): 45–56. doi:10.1023/A:1017900703234. S2CID 38282933.
- — (1997). "The Linguistic Construction of Reality". Exordium. 6: 1–7.
- — (1997). "Sylvan's Box: A Short Story and Ten Morals". Notre Dame J. Formal Logic. 38 (4): 573–582. doi:10.1305/ndjfl/1039540770. MR 1648853. Zbl 0926.03003.
- — (1997). "Inconsistent Models of Arithmetic; I Finite Models". Journal of Philosophical Logic. 26 (2): 223–235. doi:10.1023/A:1004251506208. S2CID 29922014.
- — (September 1997). "Sexual perversion". Australasian Journal of Philosophy. 75 (3): 360–372. doi:10.1080/00048409712347951. S2CID 4848870. Translated into Croatian, ch. 9 of I. Primoratz (ed.), Suvremena filozofija seksualnosti, Zagreb: KruZak, 2003.
- — (1997). "Yablo's Paradox". Analysis. 57 (4): 236–42. doi:10.1093/analys/57.4.236.
- 'Language, its Possibility, and Ineffability', pp. 790–794 of P. Wiengartner, G.Schurz and G.Dorn (eds.), Proceedings of the 20th International Wittgenstein Symposium, The Austrian Ludwig Wittgenstein Society, 1997.
- — (1998). "What's so Bad about Contradictions?". Journal of Philosophy. 95 (8): 410–426. doi:10.2307/2564636. JSTOR 2564636.
- —; Tanaka, K. (1997). "On an Error in Grove's Proof". Logique et Analyse (158): 215–7.
- 'Paraconsistent Logic', Encyclopedia of Philosophy, Vol.7, 208–11, ed. E.Craig, Routledge, 1998.
- — (1998). "Fuzzy Identity and Local Validity". Monist. 81 (2): 331–342. doi:10.5840/monist19988123.
- 'Number', Encyclopedia of Philosophy, Vol.7, 47–54, ed. E.Craig, Routledge, 1998.
- — (1998). "To be and Not to Be – That is the Answer. On Aristotle on the Law of Non-Contradiction". Philosophiegeschichte und Logische Analyse. 1: 91–130.
- — (1998). "The Trivial Object and the Non-Triviality of a Semantically Closed Theory with Descriptions". Journal of Applied Non-Classical Logics. 8 (1–2): 171–183. doi:10.1080/11663081.1998.10510937.
- — (1998). "The Import of Inclosure; some Comments on Grattan-Guinness". Mind. 107 (428): 835–840. doi:10.1093/mind/107.428.835.
- 'Dialetheism', Stanford Internet Encyclopedia of Philosophy, created 1998.
- 'What not? A Defence of a Dialetheic Account of Negation', in D.Gabbay and H.Wansing (eds.), What is Negation?, Kluwer Academic Publishers, 1999.
- — (1999). "Negation as Cancellation, and Connexivism". Topoi. 18 (2): 141–8. doi:10.1023/A:1006294205280. S2CID 117579180.
- — (1999). "On a Version of one of Zeno's Paradoxes". Analysis. 59 (1): 1–2. doi:10.1093/analys/59.1.1.
- — (December 1999). "Perceiving contradictions". Australasian Journal of Philosophy. 77 (4): 439–446. doi:10.1080/00048409912349211.
- — (December 1999). "Semantic Closure, Descriptions and Non-Triviality". Journal of Philosophical Logic. 28 (6): 549–558. doi:10.1023/A:1004608013532. S2CID 207578216.
- 'Validity', pp. 183–206 of A.Varzi (ed.) The Nature of Logic, CSLI Publications, 1999. (European Review of Philosophy, vol. 4). An abbreviated version under the same title appears as pp. 18–25 of The Logica Yearbook, 1997, ed. T.Childers, Institute of Philosophy, Czech Republic.
- — (July 2000). "Truth and Contradiction". Philosophical Quarterly. 50 (200): 305–319. doi:10.1111/j.0031-8094.2000.00187.x.
- — (2001). "Paraconsistent Belief Revision". Theoria. 68 (3): 214–228. doi:10.1111/j.1755-2567.2001.tb00204.x.
- — (June 2000). "Could everything be true?". Australasian Journal of Philosophy. 78 (2): 189–195. doi:10.1080/00048400012349471. S2CID 170771596.
- — (2000). "The Logic of Backwards Inductions". Economics and Philosophy. 16 (2): 267–285. doi:10.1017/S0266267100000250. S2CID 153692648.
- 'Worlds Apart', Mind! 2000 (a supplement to Mind 109 (2000)), 25–31.
- — (2000). "Vasil'év and Imaginary Logic". History and Philosophy of Logic. 21 (2): 135–146. doi:10.1080/01445340050064031. S2CID 121663080.
- 'Motivations for Paraconsistency: the Slippery Slope from Classical Logic to Dialetheism', in D.Batens et al. (eds.), Frontiers of Paraconsistent Logic, Research Studies Press, 2000.
- — (2000). "Inconsistent Models of Arithmetic II; the Genera Case" (PDF). Journal of Symbolic Logic. 65 (4): 1519–29. doi:10.2307/2695062. JSTOR 2695062. S2CID 43401296.
- — (2000). "On the Principle of Uniform Solution: a Reply to Smith". Mind. 109 (433): 123–6. doi:10.1093/mind/109.433.123.
- — (December 2000). "Objects of thought". Australasian Journal of Philosophy. 78 (4): 494–502. doi:10.1080/00048400012349761. S2CID 170716313.
- Logic: One or Many' in J. Woods, and B. Brown (eds.), pp. 23–28 of Logical Consequence: Rival Approaches Proceedings of the 1999 Conference of the Society of Exact Philosophy, Stanmore: Hermes, 2001.
- 'Heidegger and the Grammar of Being', ch. 10 of R.Gaskin (ed.), Grammar in Early 20th Century Philosophy, Routledge, 2001.
- 'Why it's Irrational to Believe in Consistency', pp. 284–93 of Rationality and Irrationality; Proc. 23rd International Wittgenstein Symposium, eds., B.Brogard and B.Smith, 2001.
- 'Paraconsistent Logic', Handbook of Philosophical Logic, Vol. 6, pp. 287 – 393, eds. D.Gabbay and F. Guenthner, 2nd edition, Kluwer Academic Publishers, 2002.
- 'Inconsistency and the Empirical Sciences', in J. Meheus (ed.), Inconsistency in Science, Kluwer Academic Publishers, 2002.
- 'Logicians Setting Together Contradictories. A Perspective on Relevance, Paraconsistency, and Dialetheism', ch. 14 of D.Jacquette (ed.), A Companion to Philosophical Logic, Blackwell, 2002.
- 'Fuzzy Relevant Logic', Paraconsistency: the Logical Way to the Inconsistent, ed. W.Carnielli et al., Marcel Dekker, 2002.
- — (October 2002). "The Hooded Man". Journal of Philosophical Logic. 31 (5): 445–467. doi:10.1023/A:1020153327867. S2CID 6492765.
- — (2002). "Rational Dilemmas". Analysis. 62 (1): 11–16. doi:10.1093/analys/62.1.11.
- — (2003). "Meinong and the Philosophy of Mathematics". Philosophica Mathematica. 11: 3–15. doi:10.1093/philmat/11.1.3.
- — (2003). "On Alternative Geometries, Arithmetics, and Logics; a Tribute to Łukasiewicz". Studia Logica. 74 (3): 441–468. doi:10.1023/A:1025123418085. S2CID 7731235.
- — (June 2003). "Where is Philosophy at the Start of the Twenty First century?". Proc. Aristot. Soc. 103 (1): 85–96. doi:10.1111/j.0066-7372.2003.00065.x.
- 'Geometries and Arithmetics', pp. 65–78 of P.Weingartner (ed.), Alternative Logics; Do Sciences Need Them?, Springer Verlag, 2003.
- A Site for Sorites', pp. 9–23 of J. C. Beall (ed.), Liars and Heaps: New Essays on Paradox, Oxford University Press, 2003.
- 'Inconsistent Arithmetic: Issues Technical and Philosophical', pp. 273–99 of V. F. Hendricks and J. Malinowski (eds.), Trends in Logic: 50 Years of Studia Logica (Studia Logica Library, Vol. 21), Kluwer Academic Publishers, 2003.
- 'Nagarjuna and the Limits of Thought' (with Jay Garfield), Philosophy East West 53 (2003), 1–21. Reprinted as ch. 5 of J. Garfield, Empty Words, Oxford University Press, 2002.
- 'Consistency, Paraconsistency and the Logical Limitative Theorems', in Grenzen und Grenzüberschreitungen (XIX Deutscher Kongress für Philosophie), ed. W. Hogrebe and J. Bromond, Akademie Verlag, 2004.
- Bryson, Brown; Priest, G (August 2004). "Chunk and Permeate, a Paraconsistent Inference Strategy. Part I: The Infinitesimal Calculus". Journal of Philosophical Logic. 33 (4): 379–388. doi:10.1023/B:LOGI.0000036831.48866.12. S2CID 42352264.
- —; Read, Stephen (September 2004). "Intentionality: Meinongianisn and the Medievals". Australasian Journal of Philosophy. 82 (3): 421–442. doi:10.1080/713659877. S2CID 170537104.
- 'Spiking the Field Artillery', in J. C. Beall and B. Armour-Garb (eds.), ch. 3 of Truth and Deflationism, Oxford University Press, 2005.
- —; Colyvan, Mark; Garfield, Jay (2005). "Problems with the Argument for Fine Tuning". Synthese. 145 (3): 325–338. CiteSeerX 10.1.1.130.5085. doi:10.1007/s11229-005-6195-0. S2CID 8883458.
- — (2005). "Words Without Knowledge". Philosophy and Phenomenological Research. 71 (3): 686–694. doi:10.1111/j.1933-1592.2005.tb00481.x.
- 'The Limits of Language' in K. Brown (ed.), Encyclopedia of Language and Linguistics, (second edition) Vol.7, 156–9, Elsevier, 2005.
- —; Armour-Garb, Brad (2005). "Analetheism: a Pyrrhic Victory". Analysis. 65 (2): 167–173. doi:10.1093/analys/65.2.167.
- — (2005). "Analysing of the Iraqi Adventure". Ormond Papers. 22: 147–150.
- 'The Paradoxes of Denotation', ch. 7 of Self-Reference, eds. T. Bolander, V. F. Hendrix, and S. A Pedersen, CLSI Lecture Notes, Stanford University, 2006.
- 'Logic, Paraconsistent', in D. Borchert (ed.), Encyclopedia of Philosophy (second edition), Macmillan, 2006, Vol. 7, 105–6.
- 'Logic, Relevant (Relevance)', in D. Borchert (ed.), Encyclopedia of Philosophy (second edition), Macmillan, 2006, Vol. 8, 358–9.
- 'Motion', in D. Borchert (ed.), Encyclopedia of Philosophy (second edition), Macmillan, 2006, Vol. 6, 409–11.
- Beall, JC; Brady, Ross T.; Hazen, A.P.; Priest, G; Restall, G. (December 2006). "Relevant Restricted Quantification" (PDF). Journal of Philosophical Logic. 35 (6): 587–598. CiteSeerX 10.1.1.689.1745. doi:10.1007/s10992-005-9008-5. S2CID 207210918.
- — (2006). "What is Philosophy?". Philosophy. 81 (2): 189–207. doi:10.1017/S0031819106316026. S2CID 204511023.
- — (2006). "A Hundred Flowers". Topoi. 25 (1–2): 91–5. doi:10.1007/s11245-006-0014-1. S2CID 145490555.
- —; Beall, JC (2007). "Not so Deep Inconsistency: a Reply to Eklund". Australasian Journal of Logic. 5: 74–84.
- 'Paraconsistency and Dialetheism', pp. 129–204 of Handbook of the History of Logic, Vol. 8, eds. D. Gabbay and J. Woods, North Holland, 2007.
- 'Reply to Slater', pp. 467–74 of J-Y Beziau, W. Carnielli and D. Gabbay (eds.), Handbook of Paraconsistency, College Publications, 2007.
- —; Thomason, Neil (2007). "60% Proof: Proof, Lakatos and Paraconsistency". Australasian Journal of Logic. 5: 89–100. doi:10.26686/ajl.v5i0.1789.
- 'Revenge, Field, and ZF', ch. 9 of JC Beall (ed.), Revenge of the Liar: New Essays on the Paradox, Oxford University Press, 2007.
- — (2007). "How the Particular Quantifier became Existentially Loaded Behind our Backs". Soochow Journal of Philosophical Studies. 16: 197–213.
- — (2007). "Translation of 'Logic of Paradox', 'La Logique du paraqdoxe'". Philosophie. 94 (2): 72–94. doi:10.3917/philo.094.0072.
- —; Garfield, J.; Deguchi, Y. (2008). "The Way of the Dialetheist: Contradictions in Buddhism". Philosophy East and West. 58 (3): 395–402. doi:10.1353/pew.0.0011. S2CID 62880583.
- — (2008). "Jaina Logic: a Contemporary Perspective". History and Philosophy of Logic. 29 (3): 263–278. doi:10.1080/01445340701690233. S2CID 60468331.
- — (2008). "Precis of Towards Non-Being". Review of Metaphysics. 74: 185–190.
- — (2008). "Replies to Nolan and Kroon". Philosophy and Phenomenological Research. 74: 208–214. doi:10.1111/j.1933-1592.2007.00125.x.
- — (2008). "Many-Valued Modal Logic: a Simple Approach". Review of Symbolic Logic. 1 (2): 190–203. doi:10.1017/S1755020308080179. S2CID 40861840.
- — (2008). "The Closing of the Mind: How the Particular Quantifier Became Existentially Loaded Behind our Backs". Review of Symbolic Logic. 1: 42–55. doi:10.1017/S1755020308080015. S2CID 206340884.
- "Graham Priest and Diderik Batens Interview Each Other". The Reasoner. 2 (8): 2–4. 2008.
- — (2008). "Creating Non-Existents: Some Initial Thoughts". Studies in Logic. 1: 18–24.
- — (2008). "Badici on Inclosures". Australasian Journal of Philosophy. 86: 583–596.
- — (2008). "Logical Pluralism Hollandaise". The Australasian Journal of Logic. 6: 210–4. doi:10.26686/ajl.v6i0.1802.
- 'Envelops and Indifference', (with Greg Restall), pages 283–290 in Dialogues, Logics and Other Strange Things, essays in honour of Shahid Rahman, edited by Cédric Dégremont, Laurent Keiff and Helge Rückert, College Publications, 2008.
- 'Conditionals: a Debate with Jackson', ch. 13 of I. Ravenscroft (ed.), Minds, Worlds and Conditionals: Themes from the Philosophy of Frank Jackson. Oxford University Press, 2009.
- 'Beyond the Limits of Knowledge', ch. 7 (pp. 93–104) of J. Salerno (ed.), New Essays on the Knowability Paradox, Oxford University Press, 2009.
- — (2009). "The Structure of Emptiness". Philosophy East and West. 59 (4): 467–480. doi:10.1353/pew.0.0069. S2CID 54668901.
- 'Mountains are Just Mountains' (with Jay Garfield), pp. 71–82 of J. Garfield and M. D'Amato (eds.), Pointing at the Moon: Buddhism. Logic and Analytic Philosophy, Oxford University Press, 2009.
- — (December 2009). "Obituary for Leonard Goddard". Australasian Journal of Philosophy. 87 (4): 693–4. doi:10.1080/00048400903208805. S2CID 218620456.
- Translation of 'Objects of Thought' into Japanese, in Human Ontology 15 (2009), 1–12. (Trans. S. Yamahguchi.)
- — (2009). "Neighbourhood Semantics for Intentional Operators". Review of Symbolic Logic. 2 (02): 360–373. doi:10.1017/S1755020309090170. S2CID 28444890.
- 'Not to Be', ch. 23 of R. Le Poidevin, P. Simons, A. McGonical, and R. Cameron (eds.), The Routledge Companion to Metaphysics, Routledge 2009.
- — (2009). "Dualising Intuitionist Negation". Principia. 13 (2): 165–184. doi:10.5007/1808-1711.2009v13n2p165.
- 'A Case of Mistaken Identity', ch. 11, pp. 205–222 of J. Lear and A. Oliver, The Force of Argument, Routledge, 2010.
- — (January 2010). "Hopes Fade for Saving Truth". Philosophy. 85 (1): 109–140. doi:10.1017/S0031819109990489. S2CID 170882719.
- 'Two Truths: Two Models', to appear in the Cowherds (eds.), Moonshadows, Oxford University Press.
- 'The Truth(s) about the Two Truths', (with T.Tilemans and M. Siderits) to appear in the Cowherds (eds.), Moonshadows, Oxford University Press (2010).
- — (2010). "Inclosures, Vagueness and Self-Reference". Notre Dame J. Formal Logic. 51 (1): 69–84. doi:10.1215/00294527-2010-005. MR 2666570. Zbl 1198.03034.
