= Sonja Smets =

Belgian and Dutch logician and epistemologist

- Education: Vrije Universiteit Brussel
- Scientific career
- Fields: Logician
- Workplaces: University of Amsterdam
- Doctoral advisor: Diederik Aerts, Jean Paul Van Bendegem

7th Director of the ILLC, Amsterdam
- In office 2016–2021
- Preceded by: Yde Venema
- Succeeded by: Robert Van Rooij

Sonja Smets is a Belgian and Dutch logician and epistemologist known for her work in belief revision and quantum logic. She is Professor of Logic and Epistemology at the University of Amsterdam, where she was the director of the Institute for Logic, Language and Computation (2016-2021) and is affiliated with both the Faculty of Science and the Department of Philosophy. She also holds a visiting professor position at the University of Bergen in Norway.

== Education and career ==
Smets (2022)

Smets earned her doctorate at the Vrije Universiteit Brussel in 2001, working there with physicist Diederik Aerts and psychologist Liane Gabora. Her dissertation, jointly promoted by Aerts and by mathematician and philosopher Jean Paul Van Bendegem, was The Logic of Physical Properties in Static and Dynamic Perspective.

She continued on at the Vrije Universiteit Brussel as a postdoctoral researcher and part-time lecturer until 2009. She was Rosalind Franklin Research Fellow and university lecturer at the University of Groningen from 2009 to 2012, and moved again to the University of Amsterdam in 2012, where she became Professor in Logic and Epistemology in 2016. From 2016 to 2021, she was the director of the Institute for Logic, Language and Computation. In 2019, she started a three-year part-time secondary appointment as a professor at the University of Bergen. Since 2020, she is the Vice President of the Association for Logic, Language and Information (FoLLI).

== Recognition ==
In 2012 the International Quantum Structures Association gave Smets their Birkhoff–von Neumann Prize "for her studies on quantum structures and related epistemic semantics". In 2015 the International Szklarska Poreba Center for Experimental Philosophy & Pragmasemantics awarded her their Hermann Lotze Prize, recognizing her accomplishments in four areas: quantum cognition, quantum foundations, belief revision, and truth tracking. In 2019 she was elected to the Academia Europaea. In 2022 she was elected to the Royal Netherlands Academy of Arts and Sciences.
