= Luigia Carlucci Aiello =

Italian computer scientist

Luigia (Gigina) Carlucci Aiello (also published as Luigia Carlucci and Luigia Aiello, born 1946 in Cerreto d'Esi) is an Italian computer scientist, emeritus professor of artificial intelligence at Sapienza University of Rome.

== Education and career ==
Aiello received a classical high school diploma in Fabriano. After earning a 'laurea' in applied mathematics from the University of Pisa and a diploma from the Scuola Normale Superiore di Pisa in 1968, in 1970 she became a researcher for the National Research Council (CNR) in Pisa. In that period she went twice on sabbatical leave to work with John McCarthy at Stanford University: the first time in 1973-74 with her husband, computer scientist Mario Aiello; after his death in 1976, she returned to Stanford in 1979-80. She is the mother of computer scientist Marco Aiello.

She became a professor in 1981, initially at Marche Polytechnic University, and joined Sapienza University of Rome in 1982, becoming professor of artificial intelligence in 1991.

She founded the Italian Association for Artificial Intelligence, AI*IA, in 1988, and was its first president. She was also the president of the Association for Logic, Language and Information (FoLLI) from 2004 to 2007.

== Research ==
Aiello's earliest research involved pattern recognition, and her work in the 1970s and early 1980s concerned automated theorem proving and proof assistants. Through this, she became interested in programming language semantics and the application of automated theorem proving to program correctness. Later, her interests shifted to include knowledge representation and reasoning, meta-knowledge, and default logic, as well as applications in educational technology, robotics, and computer security.

== Recognition ==
Aiello was named a Fellow of the Association for the Advancement of Artificial Intelligence in 1995, "for contributions to the field of meta-level control and reasoning, and promotion of AI in Italy and Europe". She became a Fellow of the European Coordinating Committee for Artificial Intelligence (now the European Association for Artificial Intelligence, EurAI) in 1999, and a member of the European Academy of Sciences and Arts in 2015.

In 2002, Linköping University gave her an honorary doctorate. She was the 2009 winner of the Donald E. Walker Distinguished Service Award of the International Joint Conference on Artificial Intelligence, and the 2014 winner of the EurAI Distinguished Service Award.

A festschrift in honor of her 60th birthday, Reasoning, Action and Interaction in AI Theories and Systems: Essays Dedicated to Luigia Carlucci Aiello, was published in 2006.
