= Weak interpretability =

In mathematical logic, weak interpretability is a notion of translation of logical theories, introduced together with interpretability by Alfred Tarski in 1953.

Let T and S be formal theories. Slightly simplified, T is said to be weakly interpretable in S if, and only if, the language of T can be translated into the language of S in such a way that the translation of every theorem of T is consistent with S. Of course, there are some natural conditions on admissible translations here, such as the necessity for a translation to preserve the logical structure of formulas.

A generalization of weak interpretability, tolerance, was introduced by Giorgi Japaridze in 1992.

== See also ==
- Interpretability logic
