= Interpretability =

Concept in mathematics

In mathematical logic, interpretability is a relation between formal theories that expresses the possibility of interpreting or translating one into the other.

== Informal definition ==
Assume T and S are formal theories. Slightly simplified, T is said to be interpretable in S if and only if the language of T can be translated into the language of S in such a way that S proves the translation of every theorem of T. Of course, there are some natural conditions on admissible translations here, such as the necessity for a translation to preserve the logical structure of formulas.

This concept, together with weak interpretability, was introduced by Alfred Tarski in 1953. Three other related concepts are cointerpretability, logical tolerance, and cotolerance, introduced by Giorgi Japaridze in 1992–93.

== See also ==
- Conservative extension
- Interpretation (logic)
- Interpretation (model theory)
- Interpretability logic
