= Piron =

Piron may refer to:

== People ==
- Alexis Piron (1689-1773), a French dramatist
- Armand J. Piron (1888-1943), a U.S. jazz musician
- Claude Piron (1931-2008), a Swiss translator
- Constantin Piron (1932-2012), a Belgian physicist
- Jean-Baptiste Piron (1896-1974), a Belgian general
- Shai Moshe Piron (1965-), Israeli Orthodox rabbi, educator, and politician

== Other uses ==
- Brigade Piron, a Belgian Infantry Brigade

== See also ==
- Prion, an infectious agent
