= Keith Stenning =

British cognitive scientist

Keith Stenning is a British cognitive scientist and Emeritus Professor at the University of Edinburgh in Scotland.

== Early life and education ==
Stenning attended the Royal Grammar School in High Wycombe, England, from 1959 to 1965 where he won an Open Scholarship in Natural Sciences at Trinity College, Oxford. He received a bachelor’s degree in philosophy and psychology from the University of Oxford in 1969 and a PhD from The Rockefeller University in New York in 1975, supervised by George Armitage Miller.

== Career ==
Stenning received a bachelor's degree in philosophy and psychology at the University of Oxford in 1969, and a PhD in discourse semantics as a basis for a theory of memory in New York, 1975, supervised by George Armitage Miller.

Between 1975 and 1983, he taught at Liverpool University before moving to Edinburgh to the Centre for Cognitive Science in 1983. Between 1989 and 1999 he was the director of the Human Communication Research Centre.

He is a Distinguished Fellow of the Cognitive Science Society and a Foreign Fellow of the Royal Netherlands National Academy. He was chairman of an Expert Group gathered by the European Commission Directorate-General for Research which proposed some lines of evolutionary cognitive research under the title "What it Means to be Human".

His main research interest is integrating logical and psychological accounts of reasoning. Recent work includes investigations of interpretative processes in reasoning and, with Michiel van Lambalgen at the Institute for Logic, Language and Computation in Amsterdam, the use of non-monotonic logic and neural network implementations to model reasoning.

His most recent books have dealt with how the mind responds to different representations of the same information and his 2008 book with Michiel van Lambalgen discusses the relevance of modern mathematical logic to the study of human reasoning.

He became a foreign member of the Royal Netherlands Academy of Arts and Sciences in 2005.
