= Jeroen Groenendijk =

Dutch logician, linguist and philosopher

- Born: 20 July 1949; Amsterdam, Netherlands
- Died: 17 October 2023 (aged 74); Amsterdam, Netherlands
- Education: University of Amsterdam
- Scientific career
- Fields: Logician
- Workplaces: University of Amsterdam
- Doctoral advisor: Renate Bartsch, Johan van Benthem

4th Director of the ILLC, Amsterdam
- In office 2009–2009
- Preceded by: Frank Veltman
- Succeeded by: Leen Torenvliet

Jeroen Antonius Gerardus Groenendijk (Dutch pronunciation: [jəˈruŋ ˈɣrunə(n)dɛik]; 20 July 1949 – 17 October 2023) was a Dutch logician, linguist and philosopher, working on the philosophy of language, formal semantics, pragmatics.

Groenendijk wrote a joint Ph.D. dissertation with Martin Stokhof on the formal semantics of questions, under the supervision of Renate Bartsch and Johan van Benthem. He was also an important figure in the development of dynamic semantics (together with Stokhof, Veltman and others, following earlier work by Irene Heim and Hans Kamp). His later work was mainly focused on studying and developing the recently founded framework of inquisitive semantics.

He was briefly the director of the Institute for Logic, Language and Computation (ILLC) at the University of Amsterdam and a member of the group collectively publishing under the pseudonym L. T. F. Gamut.
