= Luca Incurvati =

Logician and philosopher

Luca Incurvati is a logician and philosopher, currently an associate professor at the Institute for Logic, Language and Computation, University of Amsterdam. Incurvati's research areas include set theory, philosophy of mathematics, philosophy of language, and metaethics. In set theory and philosophy of maths, Incurvati has argued for the iterative conception of sets, based on a methodology he terms inference to the best conception. Incurvati is currently the principal investigator in the Amsterdam-based project From the Expression of Disagreement to New Foundations for Expressivist Semantics, for which he was awarded a prestigious ERC Starting Grant of 1.5 million euros. This project proposes a inferentialist expressivist treatment of disagreement, in particular arguing that the speech act of rejection is not reducible to negated assertion. For a paper produced as part of this project, Incurvati and coauthor Julian Schlöder received the 2019 Marc Sanders Prize in Metaethics.

Incurvati earned his MPhil and PhD at St John's College, University of Cambridge, where he worked under the supervision of Michael Potter and Peter Smith. He was awarded the Matthew Buncombe Prize for his MPhil thesis in 2005. Before his current position in Amsterdam, he was a lecturer at Cambridge, where he served as Director of Studies at Fitzwilliam, Gonville and Caius and Magdalene colleges.
