= Foundations of Science =

Academic journal

- Discipline: Interdisciplinary
- Language: English
- Edited by: Diederik Aerts

Publication details
- History: 1995–present
- Publisher: Springer Science+Business Media (Germany)
- Frequency: Quarterly

Standard abbreviations
- ISO 4: Found. Sci.

Indexing
- ISSN: 1233-1821 (print); 1572-8471 (web)
- OCLC no.: 41566630

Links
- Journal homepage; Online access

Foundations of Science is a peer-reviewed interdisciplinary academic journal focussing on methodological and philosophical topics concerning the structure and growth of science. It is the official journal of the Association for Foundations of Science, Language and Cognition and is published quarterly by Springer Science+Business Media. The journal was established in 1995. The editor in chief is Diederik Aerts.

== Abstracting and indexing ==
The journal is abstracted and indexed in Arts and Humanities Citation Index, Cengage, EBSCO Databases, FRANCIS, Google Scholar, Mathematical Reviews, PASCAL, Science Citation Index Expanded, Scopus, and Zentralblatt MATH.
