= Dick de Jongh =

Dutch logician and mathematician

- Born: October 19, 1939 (age 86); Enschede
- Education: University of Wisconsin-Madison University of Amsterdam Universiteit Leiden
- Scientific career
- Workplaces: University of Amsterdam
- Doctoral advisor: Stephen Kleene
- Doctoral students: Rosalie Iemhoff; Rineke Verbrugge

Dick Herman Jacobus de Jongh (born 19 October 1939, Enschede) is a Dutch logician and mathematician and professor emeritus at the University of Amsterdam. He received his PhD degree in 1968 from the University of Wisconsin–Madison under supervision of Stephen Kleene with a dissertation titled Investigations on the Intuitionistic Propositional Calculus. De Jongh is mostly known for his work on proof theory, provability logic and intuitionistic logic. De Jongh is a member of the group collectively publishing under the pseudonym L. T. F. Gamut. In

2004, on the occasion of his retirement, the Institute for Logic, Language and Computation at the University of Amsterdam published a festschrift in his honor.
