= Sergei N. Artemov =

Russian-American researcher

Sergei Nikolaevich Artemov (Russian: Сергей Николаевич Артемов)
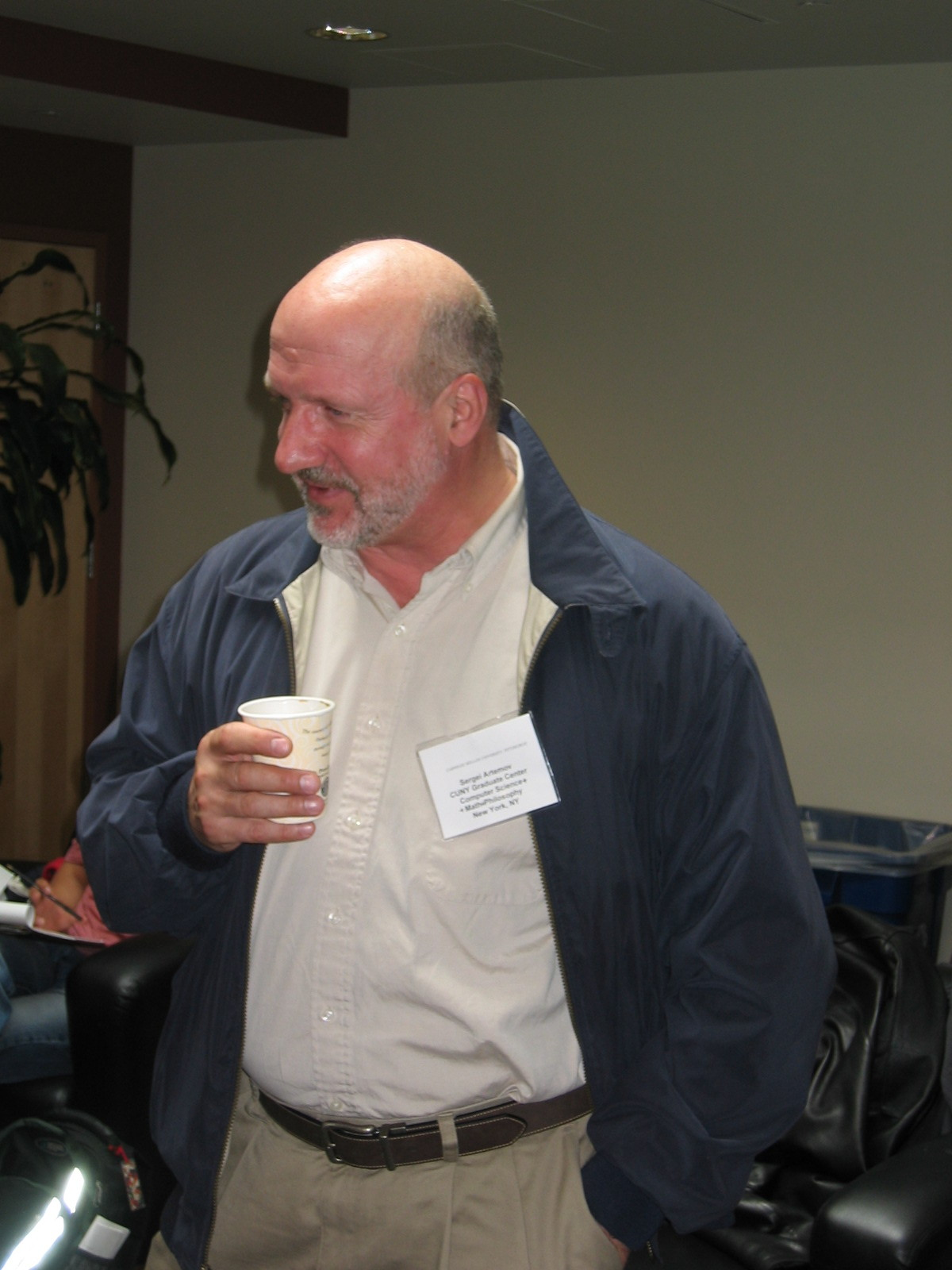
- Sergei Nikolaevich Artemov at Association of Symbolic Logic Pittsburgh, May 2004
- Born: December 25, 1951 (age 74); Uralsk, USSR
- Education: Ph.D 1980 Moscow University; D.Sc. 1988 Steklov Mathematical Institute
- Scientific career
- Fields: Computer Science; Mathematics; Philosophy
- Workplaces: Graduate Center of the City University of New York; Cornell University; Moscow University; Steklov Mathematical Institute
- Doctoral advisor: Andrei Nikolayevich Kolmogorov

Sergei Nikolaevich Artemov (Russian: Сергей Николаевич Артемов; born December 25, 1951) is a Russian-American researcher in logic and its applications. He currently holds the title of Distinguished Professor at the Graduate Center of the City University of New York where he is the founder and head of its research laboratory for logic and computation. His research interests include proof theory and logic in computer science, optimal control and hybrid systems, automated deduction and verification, epistemology, and epistemic game theory. He is best known for his invention of logics of proofs and justifications.

== Research ==
In the area of proof theory, Artemov established the impossibility of finding a complete axiom system for first-order provability logic (1985) and has pioneered studies of the logic of proofs. His major accomplishments include the solution of a problem that was discussed by Gödel in the 1930s: Artemov provided a provability semantics for modal logic that also served as a formalization of the Brouwer–Heyting–Kolmogorov provability semantics for intuitionistic logic (1995). He later offered a general logical theory of justification that renders a new, evidence-based foundation for epistemic logic (2007–2008). The notion of justification has been an essential element of epistemic studies since Plato, but was, prior to Artemov's work, conspicuously absent in logical models of knowledge. Artemov, along with researchers from Stanford University and Cornell University, initiated studies of dynamic topological logic (1997), which has since become an active research area with applications in control theory. In epistemic game theory, he has offered a new, knowledge-based approach to rationality (2009); this is currently a work in progress.

== Biography ==
Sergei Artemov was born in Uralsk, USSR, now Kazakhstan, in 1951 to Nikolai and Raisa Artemov, respectively a senior engineer and the manager of a technical college. He graduated from Moscow University with honors in 1975, going on to earn his Ph.D. in Mathematics in 1980. His mentor at Moscow University was Andrei Nikolaevich Kolmogorov, considered one of the greatest mathematicians of the 20th century.

== Academic career ==
Artemov was a researcher at the Institute of Control Sciences in Moscow from 1978–1980 and since 1980 has been a researcher at the Steklov Mathematical Institute (Moscow) where, in 1988, he completed his Doctor of Sciences degree. He has also been a faculty member at the department of mathematics of Moscow University since 1984, becoming a full professor (1993) as well as the founder and head of a laboratory of logical problems in computer science (1994). Artemov has been an editor for several leading outlets in this area, including the Annals of Pure and Applied Logic and the monograph series Studies in Logic and Foundations of Mathematics. From 1996–2001 he was a professor of mathematics and computer science at Cornell University and since 2001 has been a Distinguished Professor at the Graduate Center of the City University of New York with affiliations in computer science, mathematics, and philosophy. He has also held visiting faculty positions at Stanford University, Universities of Amsterdam, Bern, and Siena, and other academic centers.

As of 2015, Professor Artemov has supervised 27 Ph.D. dissertations.

== Awards ==
- Russian Presidential Fellowship for Outstanding Scientist, 1994
- Spinoza Lecture, European Association for Logic, Language and Information, 1999
- Clifford Lectures, 2002
- Distinguished Lecture in Computer Science, the New York Academy of Sciences, 2002
- Gala lecture for the Kurt Goedel Society, Festsaal Rathaus Vienna, 2003

== Selected bibliography ==
- S. Artemov; M. Fitting. "Justification Logic". In Edward N. Zalta (ed.). The Stanford Encyclopedia of Philosophy (Fall 2011 ed.).
- S. Artemov (2008). "The Logic of Justification". The Review of Symbolic Logic. 1 (4): 477–513. doi:10.1017/S1755020308090060. S2CID 18167013. Abstract
- S. Artemov (2008). Vincent F. Hendricks; Duncan Pritchard (eds.). Epistemology: 5 Questions. Automatic Press/VIP. pp. 11–19. ISBN 978-8792130075.
- S. Artemov (2006). "Justified common knowledge". Theoretical Computer Science. 357 (1–3): 4–22. doi:10.1016/j.tcs.2006.03.009. Abstract
- S. Artemov; E. Nogina (2005). "Introducing justification into epistemic logic". Journal of Logic and Computation. 15 (6). Oxford University Press: 1059–1073. doi:10.1093/logcom/exi053. Abstract
- S. Artemov (2001). "Explicit provability and constructive semantics" (PS). The Bulletin of Symbolic Logic. 7 (1): 1–36. doi:10.2307/2687821. JSTOR 2687821. S2CID 231796605.
- S. Artemov; J. Davoren; A. Nerode (1997). Modal logics and topological semantics for Hybrid Systems (PS) (Technical report). Cornell University. MSI 97-05.
- S. Artemov (1995). Operational modal logic (PS) (Technical report). Cornell University. MSI 95-29.
- S. Artemov (1994). "Logic of Proofs". Annals of Pure and Applied Logic. 67 (2): 29–59. doi:10.1016/0168-0072(94)90007-8.
- S. Artemov (1985). "Non-arithmeticity of truth predicate logics of provability". Soviet Mathematics Doklady. 32 (2): 403–405.
