= Are Quanta Real? =

Book by Josef-Maria Jauch

Are Quanta Real?: A Galilean Dialogue (1973) is a book by Swiss-American physicist J.M. Jauch, in which the three main characters meet over the period of several days to discuss various interpretations and philosophical consequences of quantum mechanics. Are Quanta Real? was inspired by and written in the style of Galileo's Dialogue Concerning the Two Chief World Systems. In the book, Jauch "resurrects" Galileo's three characters, Salviati, Sagredo, and Simplicio, centuries after their deaths to resume their previous dialogue in light of new developments in natural philosophy, specifically, quantum mechanics. The three characters engage in a series of debates and dialectic discussions to better their understanding of quantum phenomena using a series of thought experiments.

In a foreword to the 1989 edition, Douglas Hofstadter explains how the book initially "electrified" him and offered a sense of encouragement while he was in the initial stages of writing Gödel, Escher, Bach: an Eternal Golden Braid.

Are Quanta Real? received positive reviews from scientific journals and popular science magazines, has inspired essays on philosophy and science and was a finalist for a National Book Award.
