= Association for Logic, Language and Information =

International learned society

- FoLLI
- Abbreviation: FoLLI
- Formation: 1991; 35 years ago
- Type: INGO
- Region served: Worldwide
- President: Sonja Smets
- Parent organization: DLMPST
- Website: FoLLI Official website

The Association for Logic, Language and Information (FoLLI) is an international, especially European, learned society. It was founded in 1991 "to advance the practicing of research and education on the interfaces between Logic, Linguistics, Computer Science and Cognitive Science and related disciplines." The Journal of Logic, Language and Information (JoLLI) is published under its auspices; it co-ordinates summer schools such as the European Summer School in Logic, Language and Information (ESSLLI), the North American Summer School in Logic, Language, and Information (NASSLLI), and the International Conference and Second East-Asian School on Logic, Language and Computation (EASLLC); and it awards the E. W. Beth Dissertation Prize to outstanding dissertations in the fields of Logic, Language, and Information.

== Governance ==
The current president of FoLLI is Sonja Smets (since 2024). The current management board consists of Sonja Smets (president), Benedikt Löwe (vice president), Larry Moss (senior member & treasurer), Pritty Patel-Grosz (secretary), Nina Gierasimczuk, Francesca Poggiolesi, Philippe Schlenker, Jakub Szymanik (ESSLLI Standing Committee Chair). Past members of the FoLLI management board include Louise McNally (secretary, 2022-2024).

Past Presidents include Johan van Benthem (1991–1995), Wilfrid Hodges (1995–1996), Erhard Hinrichs (1997–1998), Paul Gochet (1999–2001), Hans Uzskoreit (2002–2003), Luigia Carlucci Aiello (2004–2007), Michael Moortgat (2007–2012), Ann Copestake (2012–2016), Valentin Goranko (2016–2020), and Larry Moss (2020-2024).

== See also ==
- Dynamic semantics
- Generalized quantifier
- Information theory
- Type theory

== Bibliography ==
- Program for ESSLLI 2012: Opole
- Program for ESSLLI 2009: Bordeaux
- Program for ESSLLI 2008: Hamburg
- Program for ESSLLI 2007: Dublin
- Program for ESSLLI 2006: Málaga
- Program for ESSLLI 2005: Edinburgh
