= Tolerant sequence =

In mathematical logic, a tolerant sequence is a sequence

$T_1$,...,$T_n$

of formal theories such that there are consistent extensions

$S_1$,...,$S_n$

of these theories with each $S_{i+1}$ interpretable in $S_i$. Tolerance naturally generalizes from sequences of theories to trees of theories. Weak interpretability can be shown to be a special, binary case of tolerance.

This concept, together with its dual concept of cotolerance, was introduced by Japaridze in 1992, who also proved that, for Peano arithmetic and any stronger theories with computable axiomatizations, tolerance is equivalent to $\Pi_1$-consistency.

== See also ==
- Interpretability
- Cointerpretability
- Interpretability logic
