= L. T. F. Gamut =

L. T. F. Gamut was a collective pseudonym for the Dutch logicians Johan van Benthem, Jeroen Groenendijk, Dick de Jongh, Martin Stokhof and Henk Verkuyl.

Gamut stands for the Dutch universities of Groningen (G), Amsterdam (am), and Utrecht (ut), then the affiliations of the authors. The initials L. T. F. stand for the discussed topics, respectively, Logic (Dutch: Logica), Language (Dutch: Taal) and Philosophy (Dutch: Filosofie).

== Publications ==
- Logica, taal en betekenis I: inleiding in de logica, Het Spectrum, 1982. (in Dutch)
- Logica, taal en betekenis II: intensionele logica en logische grammatica, Het Spectrum, 1982. (in Dutch)
- Logic, Language and Meaning, Volume I: Introduction to Logic, University of Chicago Press, 1991. Translation and revision of Logica, taal en betekenis I.
- Logic, Language and Meaning, Volume II: Intensional Logic and Logical Grammar, University of Chicago Press, 1991. Translation and revision of Logica, taal en betekenis II.
