= Rosalie Iemhoff =

Dutch logician and proof theorist

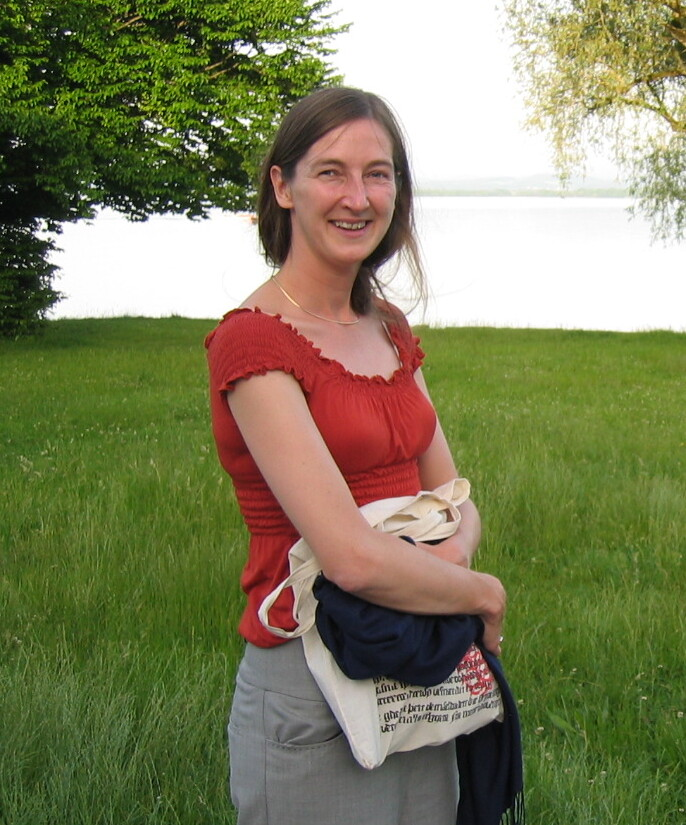
Iemhoff in 2010

Rosalie Iemhoff (born 1969) is a Dutch logician whose research interests include intuitionistic logic and proof theory. She is a professor in the Department of Philosophy and Religious Studies at Utrecht University, and an editor-in-chief of the Journal of Philosophical Logic. She is also a member of the editorial board of the Stanford Encyclopedia of Philosophy.

== Education and career ==
After earning a master's degree in mathematics from the University of Amsterdam in 1995, Iemhoff completed a PhD in mathematical logic there in 2001. Her dissertation, Provability Logic and Admissible Rules, was jointly promoted by Anne Sjerp Troelstra, Dick de Jongh, and Albert Visser.

She was a postdoctoral researcher at the University of California, San Diego and a Marie Curie Fellow at TU Wien, before becoming an assistant professor at Utrecht University in 2006. She was promoted to associate professor in 2010 and full professor in 2019.
