= Johan van Benthem (logician) =

Dutch professor, philosopher and logician

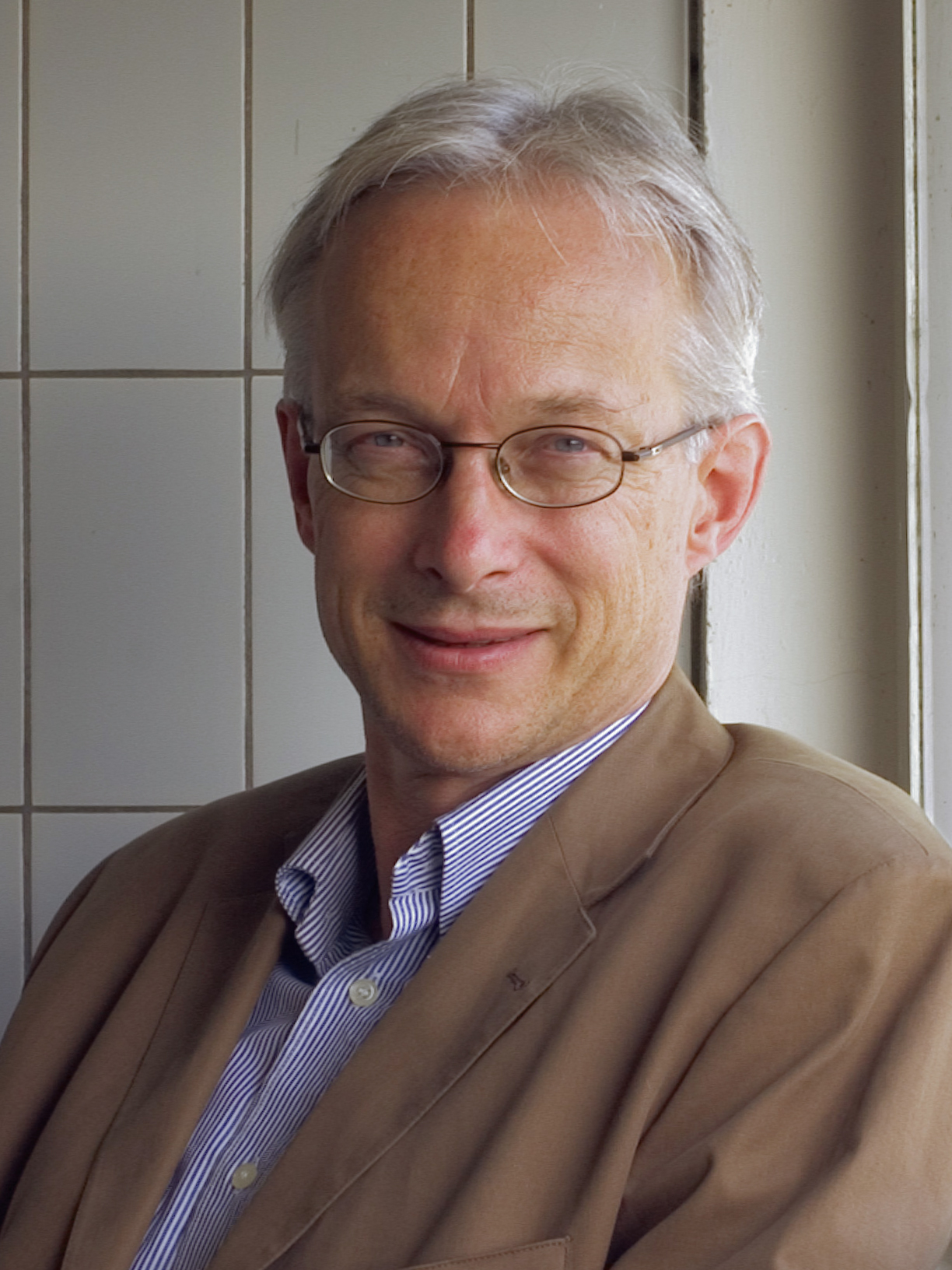
- Born: June 12, 1949 (age 77)
- Education: University of Amsterdam
- Known for: Van Benthem's theorem
- Scientific career
- Academic advisors: Martin Löb, Steven K. Thomason
- Doctoral students: Marco Aiello; Jeroen Groenendijk; Edith Hemaspaandra; Michiel van Lambalgen; Maarten de Rijke; Martin Stokhof

1st Director of the ILLC, Amsterdam
- In office 1991–1998
- Succeeded by: Martin Stokhof

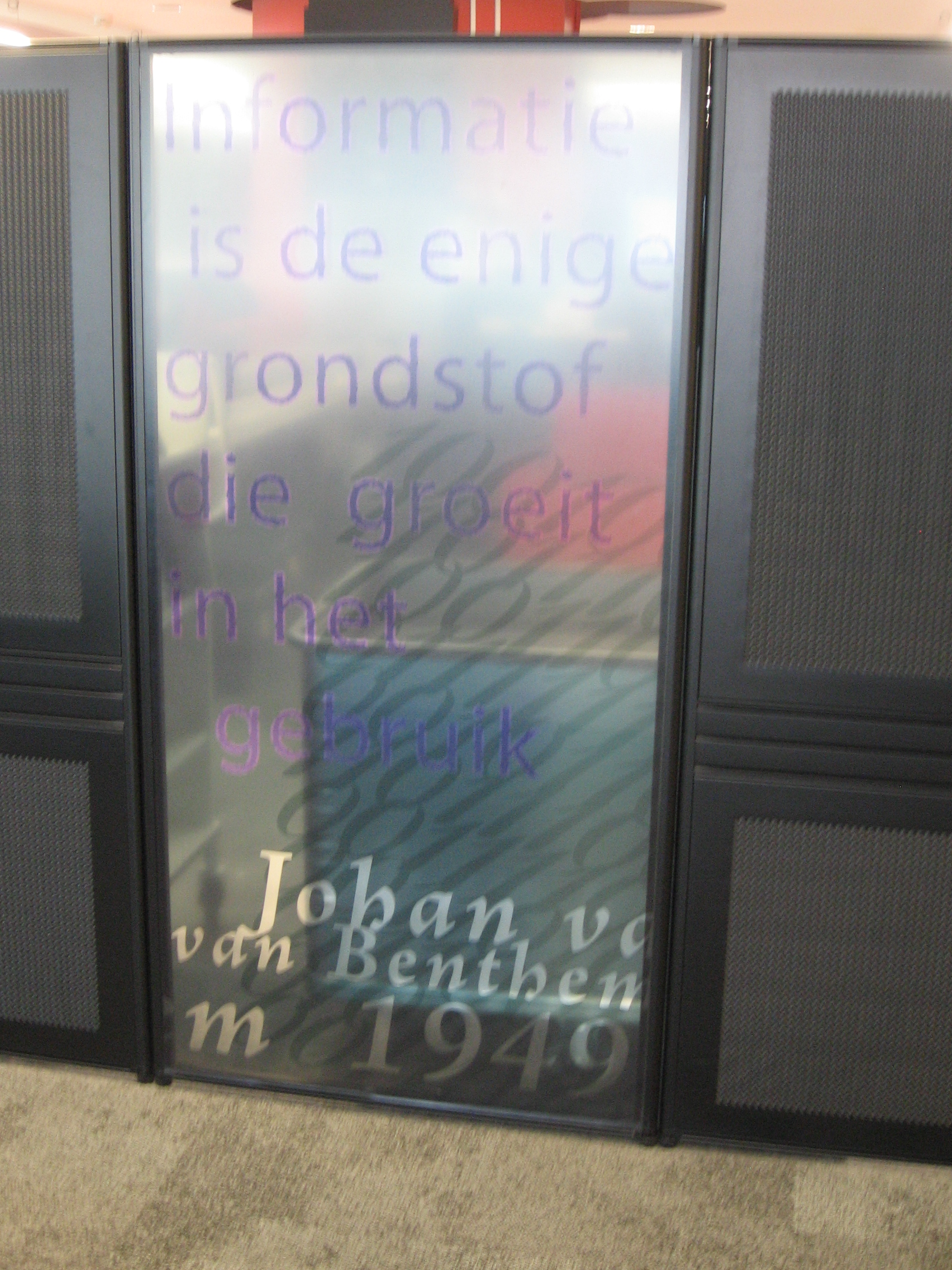
Van Benthem: Informatie is de enige grondstof die groeit in het gebruik (Dutch for Information is the only commodity that grows while being used). Quote on a glass door, Leiden University Libraries, 2025.

Johannes Franciscus Abraham Karel (Johan) van Benthem (born 12 June 1949 in Rijswijk) is a University Professor (universiteitshoogleraar) of logic, emeritus, at the University of Amsterdam at the Institute for Logic, Language and Computation and professor of philosophy at Stanford University (at CSLI). He was awarded the Spinozapremie in 1996 and elected a Foreign Fellow of the American Academy of Arts & Sciences in 2015.

== Biography ==
Van Benthem studied physics (B.Sc. 1969), philosophy (M.A. 1972) and mathematics (M.Sc. 1973) at the University of Amsterdam and received a PhD from the same university under supervision of Martin Löb in 1977. Before becoming University Professor in 2003, he held appointments at the University of Amsterdam (1973–1977), at the University of Groningen (1977–1986), and as a professor at the University of Amsterdam (1986–2003).

In 1992 he was elected member of the Royal Netherlands Academy of Arts and Sciences.

Van Benthem is known for his research in the area of modal logic. This research has resulted in Van Benthem's theorem, which states that propositional modal logic is the fragment of first-order logic that is invariant under bisimulation.

He has also been active in the fields of philosophy of science, logical structures in natural language (generalized quantifiers, categorial grammar, substructural proof theory), dynamic logic and update logic, and applications of logic to game theory, as well as applications of game theory to logic (game semantics). Van Benthem is a member of the group collectively publishing under the pseudonym L. T. F. Gamut. He has also taught in China. He made an effort to encourage and organize international collaboration between Chinese and Western logicians.

Professor van Benthem retired from the Institute for Logic, Language and Computation in September 2014.

== Publications ==
- The Logic of Time, Reidel, Dordrecht, 1983
- Modal Logic and Classical Logic, Bibliopolis, Napoli, 1985
- Logic in action, North Holland, 1991
- Handbook of Logic and Language, ed. with Alice ter Meulen, Elsevier/MIT Press, 1997
- Modal Logic: A Semantic Perspective, with Patrick Blackburn
- Modal Logic for Open Minds, CSLI Publications, 2010
- Logic in Games, MIT Press, January 2014
