= Diederik Aerts =

Belgian theoretical physicist

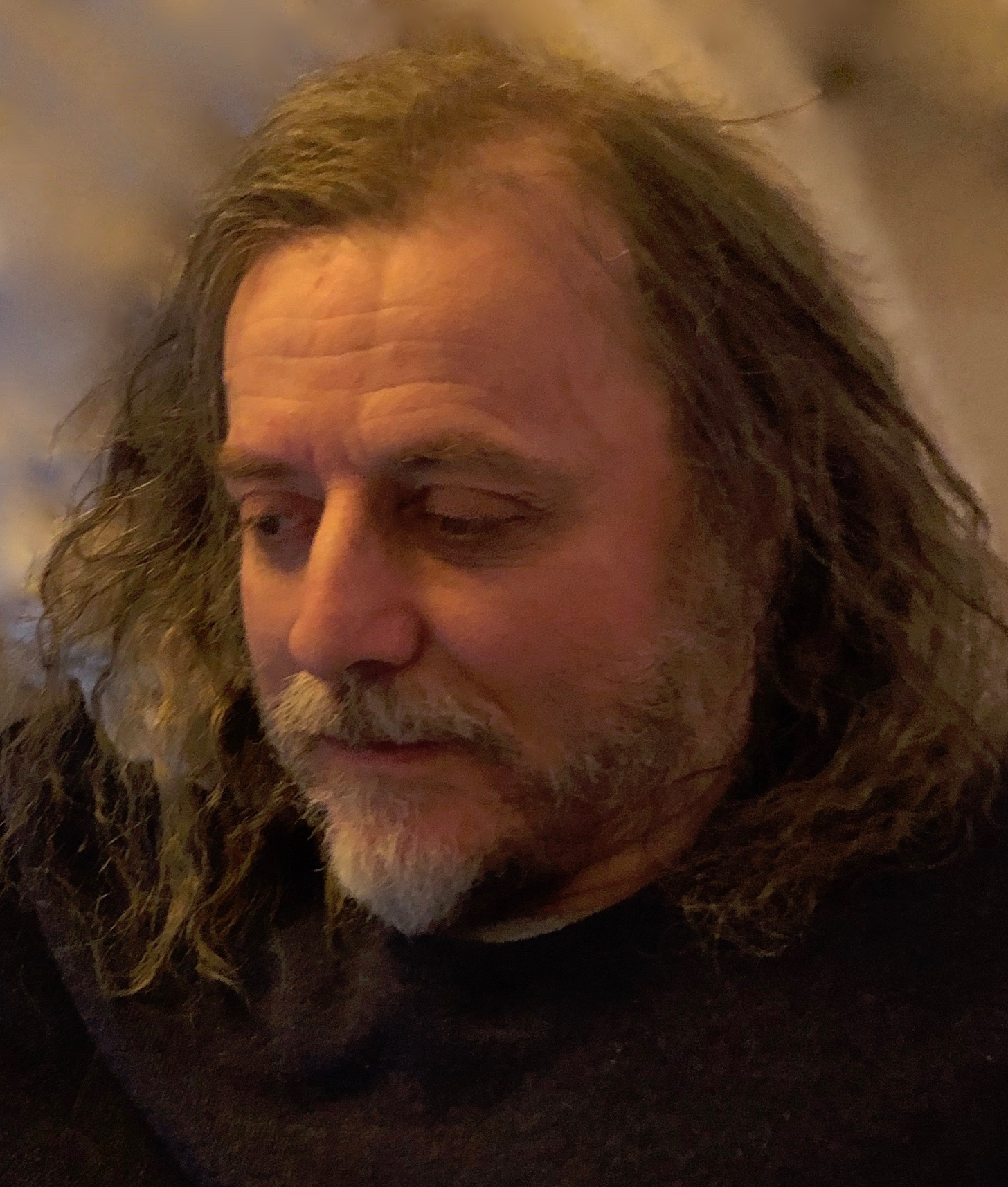
- Born: 17 April 1953 (age 73); Heist-op-den-Berg, Belgium
- Known for: research on Quantum foundations, Quantum Cognition
- Awards: Prigogine Award
- Scientific career
- Fields: Theoretical Physics, Quantum foundations, Quantum Cognition
- Workplaces: Vrije Universiteit Brussel
- Doctoral advisor: Constantin Piron
- Website: https://www.vub.be/clea/aerts/

Diederik Aerts (born April 17, 1953) is a Belgian theoretical physicist, professor at Brussels Free University (Vrije Universiteit Brussel - VUB) and founding director of the Center Leo Apostel for Interdisciplinary Studies (CLEA). (Note: Diederik Aerts's homepage) He is best known for his work in quantum foundations and quantum cognition.

== Biography ==
Diederik Aerts was born in Heist-op-den-Berg, Belgium, on April 17, 1953. He attended secondary school at 'Koninklijk Atheneum' in Heist-op-den-Berg. He received his MSc in Mathematical Physics in 1975 from Brussels Free University. For his doctorate he worked at the University of Geneva with Constantin Piron on quantum foundations, studying the description of compound quantum entities within the axiomatic approach to quantum physics developed by Josef-Maria Jauch and collaborators. He obtained his PhD in theoretical physics in 1981 from Brussels Free University with Jean Reignier.

In 1976 he started working as a researcher for the Belgian National Fund for Scientific Research (NFWO), where in 1985 he became a tenured researcher. In 1995 he became director of the VUB's Center Leo Apostel for Interdisciplinary Studies (CLEA) and in 2000 he was appointed professor at the VUB. From 1990, he has been a board member of the 'Worldviews group', founded by the late philosopher Leo Apostel and from 1997 he has been Editor-in-Chief of the international ISI and Springer Nature journal Foundations of Science. He was the scientific and artistic coordinator of the 'Einstein meets Magritte' conference, where some of the world's leading scientists and artists gathered to reflect about science, nature, human action and society. In 2020 he received the Prigogine Award, for his work in the research domain called quantum cognition, where quantum structures are used to model aspects of human cognition and decision.

== Research ==
In 1986 Aerts proposed a model in which quantum randomness arises not from the state but from the interaction with the measuring apparatus (hidden measurements): a point on the Bloch sphere is projected onto the measurement axis, where an elastic band breaks at a random, uniformly distributed location and pulls the point to one of the two poles; the resulting probabilities agree with the Born rule. In 2014 Aerts and Massimiliano Sassoli de Bianchi extended the model to systems of arbitrary finite dimension.
