= Institute for Logic, Language and Computation =

Dutch research institute

Coordinates: 52.3555°N 4.9504°E

- Former names: Instituut voor Taal; Logica en Informatie
- Established: 1991; 35 years ago
- Director: Robert van Rooij
- Location: Science Park 107, Amsterdam, 1098 XG, Netherlands
- Website: illc.uva.nl

The Institute for Logic, Language and Computation (ILLC) is a research institute of the University of Amsterdam, in which researchers from the Faculty of Science and the Faculty of Humanities collaborate. The ILLC's central research area is the study of fundamental principles of encoding, transmission and comprehension of information. Emphasis is on natural and formal languages, but other information carriers, such as images and music, are studied as well.

Research at the ILLC is interdisciplinary, and aims at bringing together insights from various disciplines concerned with information and information processing, such as logic, mathematics, computer science, computational linguistics, cognitive science, artificial intelligence, and philosophy. It is organized in the three groups Logic & Computation (project leader: Yde Venema), Logic & Language (project leader: Robert van Rooij), and Language & Computation (project leader: Jelle Zuidema) united by the key themes Explainable and Ethical AI, Interpretable Machine Learning for Natural Language Processing, Cognitive Modelling, Logic, Games and Social Agency and Quantum Information and Computation. The ILLC is involved in several international collaborations among which we highlight the Joint Research Centre for Logic (JRC), a special collaborative partnership between Tsinghua University and the University of Amsterdam.

In addition to its research activities, the ILLC is running the Graduate Programme in Logic with a PhD programme and the MSc in Logic, an international top-ranked and interdisciplinary MSc degree in logic (MSc Logic webpage). In September 2018, the institute opened the Minor in Logic and Computation, welcoming local and international bachelor students. The programme of the Minor in Logic and Computation consists of 30 EC, chosen from a list of high-profile courses organised according to four themes: Mathematics, Philosophy, Theoretical Computer Science, and Computational Linguistics and AI.

== History ==
The ILLC started off in 1986 as Instituut voor Taal, Logica en Informatie (ITLI; Institute for Language, Logic and Information). In the beginning, it was an informal association of staff members from the Faculty of Mathematics and Computer Science and the Faculty of Philosophy, and was joined by computational linguists from the Faculty of Humanities in 1989. In 1991 the institute was officially established as a University Research Institute. During 1991–1996 the programming research group of the Faculty of Mathematics and Computer Science was also part of the institute. The Applied Logic Lab from the Faculty of Social Sciences was part of the ILLC from 1996 to 2003. Other groups in computer science and cognitive science have associated themselves with the institute in 1996.

The ILLC is rooted in the Amsterdam logic research tradition dating back to the early twentieth century (including researchers such as L.E.J. Brouwer, Arend Heyting, and Evert Willem Beth). It considers Beth's Instituut voor Grondslagenonderzoek en Filosofie der Exacte Wetenschappen (founded in 1952) as its precursor.

== Directors ==
	Name	Term of office
1st Director	Johan van Benthem	1991-1998
2nd Director	Martin Stokhof	1998-2003
3rd Director	Frank Veltman	2003-2009
4th Director	Jeroen Groenendijk	2009
5th Director	Leen Torenvliet	2009-2011
6th Director	Yde Venema	2011-2016
7th Director	Sonja Smets	2016-2021
8th Director	Robert Van Rooij	since 2021

== Members ==
Other notable members and past members include:

- Renate Bartsch
- Harry Buhrman
- Peter van Emde Boas
- Henkjan Honing
- Luca Incurvati
- Theo Janssen
- Dick de Jongh
- Michiel van Lambalgen
- Benedikt Löwe
- Remko Scha
- Anne Troelstra
- Jouko Väänänen
- Paul Vitányi

== See also ==
- Korteweg-de Vries Institute for Mathematics
- Centrum Wiskunde & Informatica
