= Quantum cognition =

Application of quantum theory mathematics to cognitive phenomena

Quantum cognition uses the mathematical formalism of quantum probability theory to model psychology phenomena when classical probability theory fails. The field focuses on modeling phenomena in cognitive science that have resisted traditional techniques or where traditional models seem to have reached a barrier (e.g., human memory), and modeling preferences in decision theory that seem paradoxical from a traditional rational point of view (e.g., preference reversals). Since the use of a quantum-theoretic framework is for modeling purposes, the identification of quantum structures in cognitive phenomena does not presuppose the existence of microscopic quantum processes in the human brain.

Quantum cognition can be applied to model cognitive phenomena such as information processing by the human brain, language, decision making, human memory, concepts and conceptual reasoning, human judgment, and perception.

== Challenges for classical probability theory ==
Classical probability theory is a rational approach to inference which does not easily explain some observations of human inference in psychology. Some cases where quantum probability theory has advantages include the conjunction fallacy, the disjunction fallacy, the failures of the sure-thing principle, and question-order bias in judgement.

=== Conjunction fallacy ===
If participants in a psychology experiment are told about "Linda", described as looking like a feminist but not like a bank teller, then asked to rank the probability, $P$ that Linda is feminist, a bank teller or a feminist and a bank teller, they respond with values that indicate:
$$P(\text{feminist}) > P(\text{feminist}\ \&\  \text{bank teller}) > P(\text{bank teller})$$
Rational classical probability theory makes the incorrect prediction: it expects humans to rank the conjunction less probable than the bank teller option. Many variations of this experiment demonstrate that the fallacy represents human cognition in this case and not an artifact of one presentation.

Quantum cognition models this probability-estimation scenario with quantum probability theory which always ranks sequential probability, $P(\text{feminist}\ \&\ \text{bank teller})$, greater than the direct probability, $P(\text{bank teller})$. The idea is that a person's understanding of "bank teller" is affected by the context of the question involving "feminist". The two questions are "incompatible": to treat them with classical theory would require separate reasoning steps.

== Main subjects of research ==
=== Quantum-like models of information processing ===
The quantum cognition concept is based on the observation that various cognitive phenomena are more adequately described by quantum probability theory than by the classical probability theory (see examples below). Thus, the quantum formalism is considered an operational formalism that describes non-classical processing of probabilistic data.

Here, contextuality is the key word (see the monograph of Khrennikov for detailed representation of this viewpoint). Quantum mechanics is fundamentally contextual. Quantum systems do not have objective properties which can be defined independently of measurement context. As has been pointed out by Niels Bohr, the whole experimental arrangement must be taken into account. Contextuality implies existence of incompatible mental variables, violation of the classical law of total probability, and constructive or destructive interference effects. Thus, the quantum cognition approach can be considered an attempt to formalize contextuality of mental processes, by using the mathematical apparatus of quantum mechanics.

=== Decision making ===
Suppose a person is given an opportunity to play two rounds of the following gamble: a coin toss will determine whether the subject wins $200 or loses $100. Suppose the subject has decided to play the first round, and does so. Some subjects are then given the result (win or lose) of the first round, while other subjects are not yet given any information about the results. The experimenter then asks whether the subject wishes to play the second round. Performing this experiment with real subjects gives the following results:

1. When subjects believe they won the first round, the majority of subjects choose to play again on the second round.
2. When subjects believe they lost the first round, the majority of subjects choose to play again on the second round.

Given these two separate choices, according to the sure thing principle of rational decision theory, they should also play the second round even if they don't know or think about the outcome of the first round. But, experimentally, when subjects are not told the results of the first round, the majority of them decline to play a second round. This finding violates the law of total probability, yet it can be explained as a quantum interference effect in a manner similar to the explanation for the results from double-slit experiment in quantum physics. Similar violations of the sure-thing principle are seen in empirical studies of the Prisoner's Dilemma and have likewise been modeled in terms of quantum interference.

The above deviations from classical rational expectations in agents’ decisions under uncertainty produce well known paradoxes in behavioral economics, that is, the Allais, Ellsberg and Machina paradoxes. These deviations can be explained if one assumes that the overall conceptual landscape influences the subject's choice in a neither predictable nor controllable way. A decision process is thus an intrinsically contextual process, hence it cannot be modeled in a single Kolmogorovian probability space, which justifies the employment of quantum probability models in decision theory. More explicitly, the paradoxical situations above can be represented in a unified Hilbert space formalism where human behavior under uncertainty is explained in terms of genuine quantum aspects, namely, superposition, interference, contextuality and incompatibility.

Considering automated decision making, quantum decision trees have different structure compared to classical decision trees. Data can be analyzed to see if a quantum decision tree model fits the data better.

=== Human probability judgments ===
Quantum probability provides a new way to explain human probability judgment errors including the conjunction and disjunction errors. A conjunction error occurs when a person judges the probability of a likely event L and an unlikely event U to be greater than the unlikely event U; a disjunction error occurs when a person judges the probability of a likely event L to be greater than the probability of the likely event L or an unlikely event U. Quantum probability theory is a generalization of Bayesian probability theory because it is based on a set of von Neumann axioms that relax some of the classic Kolmogorov axioms. The quantum model introduces a new fundamental concept to cognition—the compatibility versus incompatibility of questions and the effect this can have on the sequential order of judgments. Quantum probability provides a simple account of conjunction and disjunction errors as well as many other findings such as order effects on probability judgments.

The liar paradox - The contextual influence of a human subject on the truth behavior of a cognitive entity is explicitly exhibited by the so-called liar paradox, that is, the truth value of a sentence like "this sentence is false". One can show that the true-false state of this paradox is represented in a complex Hilbert space, while the typical oscillations between true and false are dynamically described by the Schrödinger equation.

=== Knowledge representation ===
Concepts are basic cognitive phenomena, which provide the content for inference, explanation, and language understanding. Cognitive psychology has researched different approaches for understanding concepts including exemplars, prototypes, and neural networks, and different fundamental problems have been identified, such as the experimentally tested non classical behavior for the conjunction and disjunction of concepts, more specifically the Pet-Fish problem or guppy effect, and the overextension and underextension of typicality and membership weight for conjunction and disjunction. By and large, quantum cognition has drawn on quantum theory in three ways to model concepts.

1. Exploit the contextuality of quantum theory to account for the contextuality of concepts in cognition and language and the phenomenon of emergent properties when concepts combine
2. Use quantum entanglement to model the semantics of concept combinations in a non-decompositional way, and to account for the emergent properties/associates/inferences in relation to concept combinations
3. Use quantum superposition to account for the emergence of a new concept when concepts are combined, and as a consequence put forward an explanatory model for the Pet-Fish problem situation, and the overextension and underextension of membership weights for the conjunction and disjunction of concepts.

The large amount of data collected by Hampton on the combination of two concepts can be modeled in a specific quantum-theoretic framework in Fock space where the observed deviations from classical set (fuzzy set) theory, the above-mentioned over- and under- extension of membership weights, are explained in terms of contextual interactions, superposition, interference, entanglement and emergence. And, more, a cognitive test on a specific concept combination has been performed which directly reveals, through the violation of Bell's inequalities, quantum entanglement between the component concepts.

=== Semantic analysis and information retrieval ===
The research in (iv) had a deep impact on the understanding and initial development of a formalism to obtain semantic information when dealing with concepts, their combinations and variable contexts in a corpus of unstructured documents. This conundrum of natural language processing (NLP) and information retrieval (IR) on the web – and data bases in general – can be addressed using the mathematical formalism of quantum theory. As basic steps, (a) K. Van Rijsbergen introduced a quantum structure approach to IR, (b) Widdows and Peters utilised a quantum logical negation for a concrete search system, and Aerts and Czachor identified quantum structure in semantic space theories, such as latent semantic analysis. Since then, the employment of techniques and procedures induced from the mathematical formalisms of quantum theory – Hilbert space, quantum logic and probability, non-commutative algebras, etc. – in fields such as IR and NLP, has produced significant results.

== History ==
Ideas for applying the formalisms of quantum theory to cognition first appeared in the 1990s by Diederik Aerts and his collaborators Jan Broekaert, Sonja Smets and Liane Gabora, by Harald Atmanspacher, Robert Bordley, and Andrei Khrennikov. A special issue on Quantum Cognition and Decision appeared in the Journal of Mathematical Psychology (2009, vol 53.), which planted a flag for the field. A few books related to quantum cognition have been published including those by Khrennikov (2004, 2010), Ivancivic and Ivancivic (2010), Busemeyer and Bruza (2012), E. Conte (2012). The first Quantum Interaction workshop was held at Stanford in 2007 organized by Peter Bruza, William Lawless, C. J. van Rijsbergen, and Don Sofge as part of the 2007 AAAI Spring Symposium Series. This was followed by workshops at Oxford in 2008, Saarbrücken in 2009, at the 2010 AAAI Fall Symposium Series held in Washington, D.C., 2011 in Aberdeen, 2012 in Paris, and 2013 in Leicester. Tutorials also were presented annually beginning in 2007 until 2013 at the annual meeting of the Cognitive Science Society. A Special Issue on Quantum models of Cognition appeared in 2013 in the journal Topics in Cognitive Science.

== See also ==
- Bayesian approaches to brain function – Explaining the brain's abilities through statistical principles
- Quantum Bayesianism – Interpretation of quantum mechanics
- Quantum logic – Theory of logic to account for observations from quantum theory
