= Martin Stokhof =

Dutch logician and philosopher (born 1950)

- Born: 1950 (age 75–76); Amsterdam
- Education: University of Amsterdam
- Scientific career
- Fields: Logician
- Workplaces: University of Amsterdam
- Doctoral advisor: Renate Bartsch, Johan van Benthem

2nd Director of the ILLC, Amsterdam
- In office 1998–2003
- Preceded by: Johan van Benthem
- Succeeded by: Frank Veltman

Martin Stokhof (born 1950, Amsterdam) is a Dutch logician and philosopher. Stokhof wrote a joint Ph.D. dissertation with Jeroen Groenendijk on the semantics of questions, under the supervision of Renate Bartsch and Johan van Benthem. He was also an important figure in the development of dynamic semantics (together with Groenendijk, Veltman and others, following work by Irene Heim and Kamp). He is also known for his work on Ludwig Wittgenstein.

He is a former director of the Institute for Logic, Language and Computation at the University of Amsterdam and a member of the group collectively publishing under the pseudonym L. T. F. Gamut.

In 2006 he was elected member of the Royal Netherlands Academy of Arts and Sciences.
