= Kai Wehmeier =

German-American philosopher and logician (born 1968)

- Born: 15 March 1968 (age 58); Summit, NJ
- Education: University of California, Berkeley (M.A.); Ruhr-Universität Bochum, Germany (M.A.); Westfälische Wilhelms-Universität Münster, Germany (Ph.D.)
- Scientific career
- Fields: Logic, Philosophy of logic, Philosophy of language, Philosophy of mathematics, Metaphysics, Early Analytic Philosophy (especially Frege and Wittgenstein)
- Workplaces: University of California, Irvine
- Thesis: Semantical Investigations in Intuitionistic First-order Arithmetic (1996)
- Doctoral advisor: Justus Diller, Wolfram Pohlers

Kai Frederick Wehmeier (born 1968) is a German-American philosopher and logician.

He is best known for proving that the fragment of Frege's inconsistent logical theory of Grundgesetze der Arithmetik becomes consistent upon restricting the complexity of comprehension formulas in the second-order comprehension schema to $\Delta^1_1$, for his development of a system of subjunctive modal logic and its use in rebutting Kripke's modal argument against description theories of proper names, as well as for refining and defending the thesis that there is no binary identity relation between objects.

Wehmeier is currently a professor in the Department of Logic and Philosophy of Science and the Department of Philosophy at the University of California, Irvine. He is also the director of UC Irvine's Center for the Advancement of Logic, its Philosophy, History, and Applications (C-ALPHA).

== Selected publications ==
- "Consistent Fragments of Grundgesetze and the Existence of Non-Logical Objects," Synthese 121, 1999, pp. 309–328.
- "In the Mood," Journal of Philosophical Logic 33, 2004, pp. 607–630.
- "How to live without identity—and why," Australasian Journal of Philosophy 90, 2012, pp. 761–777.
- "Subjunctivity and Conditionals," The Journal of Philosophy 110, 2013, pp. 117–142.
