= Japaridze's polymodal logic =

Japaridze's polymodal logic (GLP) is a system of provability logic with infinitely many provability modalities. This system has played an important role in some applications of provability algebras in proof theory, and has been extensively studied since the late 1980s. It is named after Giorgi Japaridze.

== Language and axiomatization ==
The language of GLP extends that of the language of classical propositional logic by including the infinite series [0],[1],[2],... of necessity operators. Their dual possibility operators <0>,<1>,<2>,... are defined by <n>p = ¬[n]¬p.

The axioms of GLP are all classical tautologies and all formulas of one of the following forms:

- [n](p → q) → ([n]p → [n]q)
- [n]([n]p → p) → [n]p
- [n]p → [n+1]p
- <n>p → [n+1]<n>p

And the rules of inference are:

- From p and p → q conclude q
- From p conclude [0]p

== Provability semantics ==
Consider a sufficiently strong first-order theory T such as Peano Arithmetic PA. Define the series T_{0},T_{1},T_{2},... of theories as follows:

- T_{0} is T
- T_{n+1} is the extension of T_{n} through the additional axioms ∀xF(x) for each formula F(x) such that T_{n} proves all of the formulas F(0), F(1), F(2),...

For each n, let Pr_{n}(x) be a natural arithmetization of the predicate "x is the Gödel number of a sentence provable in T_{n}".

A realization is a function * that sends each nonlogical atom a of the language of GLP to a sentence a* of the language of T. It extends to all formulas of the language of GLP by stipulating that * commutes with the Boolean connectives, and that ([n]F)* is Pr_{n}('F*'), where 'F*' stands for (the numeral for) the Gödel number of F*.

An arithmetical completeness theorem for GLP states that a formula F is provable in GLP if and only if, for every interpretation *, the sentence F* is provable in T.

The above understanding of the series T_{0},T_{1},T_{2},... of theories is not the only natural understanding yielding the soundness and completeness of GLP. For instance, each theory T_{n} can be understood as T augmented with all true Π_{n} sentences as additional axioms. George Boolos showed that GLP remains sound and complete with analysis (second-order arithmetic) in the role of the base theory T.

== Other semantics ==
GLP has been shown to be incomplete with respect to any class of Kripke frames.

A natural topological semantics of GLP interprets modalities as derivative operators of a polytopological space. Such spaces are called GLP-spaces whenever they satisfy all the axioms of GLP. GLP is complete with respect to the class of all GLP-spaces.

== Computational complexity ==
The problem of being a theorem of GLP is PSPACE-complete. So is the same problem restricted to only variable-free formulas of GLP.

== History ==
GLP, under the name GP, was introduced by Giorgi Japaridze in his PhD thesis "Modal Logical Means of Investigating Provability" (Moscow State University, 1986) and published two years later along with (a) the completeness theorem for GLP with respect to its provability interpretation (Beklemishev subsequently came up with a simpler proof of the same theorem) and (b) a proof that Kripke frames for GLP do not exist. Beklemishev also conducted a more extensive study of Kripke models for GLP. Topological models for GLP were studied by Beklemishev, Bezhanishvili, Icard and Gabelaia. The decidability of GLP in polynomial space was proven by I. Shapirovsky, and the PSPACE-hardness of its variable-free fragment was proven by F. Pakhomov. Among the most notable applications of GLP has been its use in proof-theoretically analyzing Peano arithmetic, elaborating a canonical way for recovering ordinal notation up to ɛ_{0} from the corresponding algebra, and constructing simple combinatorial independent statements (Beklemishev).

An extensive survey of GLP in the context of provability logics in general was given by George Boolos in his book The Logic of Provability.

== Literature ==
- L. Beklemishev, "Provability algebras and proof-theoretic ordinals, I". Annals of Pure and Applied Logic 128 (2004), pp. 103–123.
- L. Beklemishev, J. Joosten and M. Vervoort, "A finitary treatment of the closed fragment of Japaridze's provability logic". Journal of Logic and Computation 15 (2005), No 4, pp. 447–463.
- L. Beklemishev, "Kripke semantics for provability logic GLP". Annals of Pure and Applied Logic 161, 756–774 (2010).
- L. Beklemishev, G. Bezhanishvili and T. Icar, "On topological models of GLP". Ways of proof theory, Ontos Mathematical Logic, 2, eds. R. Schindler, Ontos Verlag, Frankfurt, 2010, pp. 133–153.
- L. Beklemishev, "On the Craig interpolation and the fixed point properties of GLP". Proofs, Categories and Computations. S. Feferman et al., eds., College Publications 2010. pp. 49–60.
- L. Beklemishev, "Ordinal completeness of bimodal provability logic GLB". Lecture Notes in Computer Science 6618 (2011), pp. 1–15.
- L. Beklemishev, "A simplified proof of arithmetical completeness theorem for provability logic GLP". Proceedings of the Steklov Institute of Mathematics 274 (2011), pp. 25–33.
- L. Beklemishev and D. Gabelaia, "Topological completeness of provability logic GLP". Annals of Pure and Applied Logic 164 (2013), pp. 1201–1223.
- G. Boolos, "The analytical completeness of Japaridze's polymodal logics". Annals of Pure and Applied Logic 61 (1993), pp. 95–111.
- G. Boolos, The Logic of Provability Cambridge University Press, 1993.
- E.V. Dashkov, "On the positive fragment of the polymodal provability logic GLP". Mathematical Notes 2012; 91:318–333.
- D. Fernandez-Duque and J.Joosten, "Well-orders in the transfinite Japaridze algebra". Logic Journal of the IGPL 22 (2014), pp. 933–963. doi:10.1093/jigpal/jzu018. arXiv:1212.3468 .
- G. Japaridze, "The polymodal logic of provability". Intensional Logics and Logical Structure of Theories. Metsniereba, Tbilisi, 1988, pp. 16–48 (Russian).
- F. Pakhomov, "On the complexity of the closed fragment of Japaridze's provability logic". Archive for Mathematical Logic 53 (2014), pp. 949–967.
- D.S. Shamkanov, "Interpolation properties for provability logics GL and GLP". Proceedings of the Steklov Institute of Mathematics 274 (2011), pp. 303–316.
- I. Shapirovsky, "PSPACE-decidability of Japaridze's polymodal logic". Advances in Modal Logic 7 (2008), pp. 289–304.
