= Henkjan Honing =

Dutch researcher

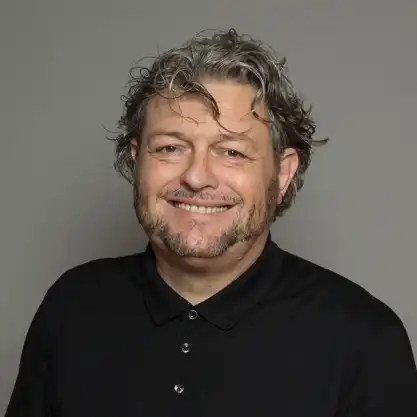
- Born: 15 May 1959 (age 67); Hilversum, Netherlands
- Education: City University, London, UK
- Known for: Rhythm perception, timing and tempo; Mechanisms underlying musicality
- Awards: Distinguished Lorentz Fellow 2013/14, a prize granted by the Lorentz Center for the Sciences and the Netherlands Institute for Advanced Study in the Humanities and Social Sciences; Member elect Royal Netherlands Academy of Arts and Sciences (KNAW); SMPC Lifetime Achievement Award.
- Scientific career
- Fields: Music cognition
- Workplaces: University of Amsterdam; Amsterdam Brain and Cognition, Institute for Logic, Language and Computation; Institute for Advanced Study (UvA-IAS)
- Thesis: (1991)
- Academic advisors: Eric Clarke (musicologist), H. Christopher Longuet-Higgins
- Website: https://www.mcg.uva.nl/people/hhoning/

Henkjan Honing (born 1959 in Hilversum) is a Dutch researcher. He is professor emeritus of Music Cognition at the Faculty of Science of the University of Amsterdam. He conducts his research under the auspices of the Institute for Logic, Language and Computation, and the University of Amsterdam's Brain and Cognition center.

== Early life and education ==
Honing obtained his PhD at City University (London) in 1991 with research into the representation of time and temporal structure in music. During the period between 1992 and 1997, he worked as a KNAW Research Fellow (Academieonderzoeker) at the University of Amsterdam's Institute for Logic, Language and Computation, where he conducted a study on the formalization of musical knowledge. Up until 2003, he worked as a research coordinator at the Nijmegen Institute for Cognition and Information (now F.C. Donders Centre for Cognitive Neuroimaging) where he specialized in the computational modeling of music cognition.

== Career ==
In 2007, he was appointed Associate Professor in Music Cognition at the University of Amsterdam's Musicology capacity group. In 2010 he was awarded the KNAW-Hendrik Muller chair, designated on behalf of the Royal Netherlands Academy of Arts and Sciences. In 2012 he was appointed strategic Professor of Cognitive and Computational Musicology, and in 2014 he became full professor in Music Cognition at both the Faculty of Humanities and the Faculty of Science of the University of Amsterdam. In 2013 he received a Distinguished Lorentz Fellowship, a prize granted by the Lorentz Center for the Sciences and the Netherlands Institute for Advanced Study in the Humanities and Social Sciences. In 2019 Honing was elected member of the Royal Netherlands Academy of Arts and Sciences. In 2024 he received a Lifetime Achievement Award from the Society for Music Perception and Cognition (SMPC). In 2025 he was elected member of the Academia Europaea.

=== Research ===
Henkjan Honing authored over 250 scientific publications in the areas of music cognition, musicality and music technology, and published several books for a general audience, including Iedereen is muzikaal. Wat we weten over het luisteren naar muziek (Nieuw Amsterdam, 2009/2012), published in English as Music Cognition: The Basics (Routledge, 2021), and Aap slaat maat. Op zoek naar de oorsprong van muzikaliteit bij mens en dier (Nieuw Amsterdam, 2018) that appeared in English as The Evolving Animal Orchestra: In Search of What Makes Us Musical (2019, The MIT Press). In 2018 a research agenda on the topic of musicality appeared as The Origins of Musicality (2018, The MIT Press).

== Personal life ==
Henkjan is the older brother of drummer Bill Honing and saxophonist Yuri Honing.

== Selected studies ==
- Honing, H. (2021). Music Cognition: The Basics. Routledge. ISBN 9780367745004.
- Honing, H. (2019). The Evolving Animal Orchestra. In Search of What Makes Us Musical. The MIT Press. ISBN 9780262039321.
- Honing, H. (2018). The Origins of musicality. The MIT Press. ISBN 9780262037457.
- Honing, H.; ten Cate, C.; Peretz, I.; Trehub, S. (2015). "Without it no music: Cognition, biology, and evolution of musicality". Philosophical Transactions of the Royal Society B: Biological Sciences. 370 (1664): 1664. doi:10.1098/rstb.2014.0088. PMC 4321129. PMID 25646511.
- Complete list of publications
