= Giorgi Japaridze =

Giorgi Japaridze (also spelled Giorgie Dzhaparidze) is a Georgian-American researcher in logic and theoretical computer science. He currently holds the title of Full Professor at the Computing Sciences Department of Villanova University. Japaridze is best known for his invention of computability logic, cirquent calculus, and Japaridze's polymodal logic.

== Research ==
During 1985–1988 Japaridze elaborated the system GLP, known as Japaridze's polymodal logic. This is a system of modal logic with the "necessity" operators [0],[1],[2],…, understood as a natural series of incrementally weak provability predicates for Peano arithmetic. In "The polymodal logic of provability" Japaridze proved the arithmetical completeness of this system, as well as its inherent incompleteness with respect to Kripke frames. GLP has been extensively studied by various authors during the subsequent three decades, especially after Lev Beklemishev, in 2004, pointed out its usefulness in understanding the proof theory of arithmetic (provability algebras and proof-theoretic ordinals).

Japaridze has also studied the first-order (predicate) versions of provability logic. He came up with an axiomatization of the single-variable fragment of that logic, and proved its arithmetical completeness and decidability. In the same paper he showed that, on the condition of the 1-completeness of the underlying arithmetical theory, predicate provability logic with non-iterated modalities is recursively enumerable. In Studia Logica 50 he did the same for the predicate provability logic with non-modalized quantifiers.

In 1992–1993, Japaridze came up with the concepts of cointerpretability, tolerance and cotolerance, naturally arising in interpretability logic. He proved that cointerpretability is equivalent to 1-conservativity and tolerance is equivalent to 1-consistency. The former was an answer to the long-standing open problem regarding the metamathematical meaning of 1-conservativity. Within the same line of research, Japaridze constructed the modal logics of tolerance (1993) and of the arithmetical hierarchy (1994), and proved their arithmetical completeness. In 2002 Japaridze introduced "the Logic of Tasks", which later became a part of his Abstract Resource Semantics on one hand, and a fragment of Computability Logic (see below) on the other hand.

Japaridze is best known for founding Computability Logic in 2003 and making subsequent contributions to its evolution. This is a long-term research program and a semantical platform for "redeveloping logic as a formal theory of (interactive) computability, as opposed to the formal theory of truth that it has more traditionally been". In 2006 Japaridze conceived cirquent calculus as a proof-theoretic approach that manipulates graph-style constructs, termed cirquents, instead of the more traditional and less general tree-like constructs such as formulas or sequents. This novel proof-theoretic approach was later successfully used to "tame" various fragments of computability logic, which had otherwise stubbornly resisted all axiomatization attempts using the traditional proof systems such as sequent calculus or Hilbert-style systems. It was also used to (define and) axiomatize the purely propositional fragment of independence-friendly logic. The birth of cirquent calculus was accompanied with offering the associated "abstract resource semantics". Cirquent calculus with that semantics can be seen as a logic of resources that, unlike linear logic, makes it possible to account for resource-sharing. As such, it has been presented as a viable alternative to linear logic by Japaridze, who repeatedly has criticized the latter for being neither sufficiently expressive nor complete as a resource logic. This challenge, however, has remained largely unnoticed by the linear logic community, which never responded to it.

Japaridze has cast a similar (and also never answered) challenge to intuitionistic logic, criticizing it for lacking a convincing semantical justification the associated constructivistic claims, and for being incomplete as a result of "throwing out the baby with the bath water". Heyting's intuitionistic logic, in its full generality, has been shown to be sound but incomplete with respect to the semantics of computability logic. The positive (negation-free) propositional fragment of intuitionistic logic, however, has been proven to be complete with respect to the computability-logic semantics. In "On the system CL12 of computability logic", on the platform of computability logic, Japaridze generalized the traditional concepts of time and space complexities to interactive computations, and introduced a third sort of a complexity measure for such computations, termed "amplitude complexity". Among Japaridze's contributions is the elaboration of a series of systems of (Peano) arithmetic based on computability logic, named "clarithmetics". These include complexity-oriented systems (in the style of bounded arithmetic) for various combinations of time, space and amplitude complexity classes.

== Biography and academic career ==
Giorgi Japaridze was born in 1961 in Tbilisi, Georgia (then in the Soviet Union). He graduated from Tbilisi State University in 1983, received a PhD degree (in philosophy) from Moscow State University in 1987, and then a second PhD degree (in computer science) from the University of Pennsylvania in 1998. During 1987–1992 Japaridze worked as a Senior Researcher at the Institute of Philosophy of the Georgian Academy of Sciences. During 1992–1993 he was a Postdoctoral Fellow at the University of Amsterdam (Mathematics and Computer Science department). During 1993–1994 he held the position of a visiting associate professor at the University of Notre Dame (Philosophy Department). He has joined the faculty of Villanova University (Computing Sciences Department). Japaridze has also worked as a visiting professor at Xiamen University (2007) and Shandong University (2010–2013) in China.

== Awards ==
In 1982, for his work "Determinism and Freedom of Will", Japaridze received a Medal from the Georgian Academy of Sciences for the best student research paper, granted to one student in the nation each year. In 2015, he received an Outstanding Faculty Research Award from Villanova University, granted to one faculty member each year. Japaridze has been a recipient of various grants and scholarships, including research grants from the US National Science Foundation, Villanova University and Shandong University, Postdoctoral Fellowship from the Dutch government, Smullyan Fellowship from Indiana University (never utilized), and Dean's Fellowship from the University of Pennsylvania.

== Related bibliography ==
- F. Pakhomov, "On the complexity of the closed fragment of Japaridze's provability logic". Archive for Mathematical Logic 53 (2014), pages 949-967.
- D. Fernandez-Duque and J. Joosten, "Well-orders in the transfinite Japaridze algebra". Logic Journal of the IGPL 22 (2014), pages 933-963. Preprint on J. Joosten’s website (2012), last revised version in 2014:arXiv:1212.3468v4.
- W. Xu, "A propositional system induced by Japaridze's approach to IF logic". Logic Journal of the IGPL 22 (2014), pages 982-991.
- I. Shapirovsky, "PSPACE-decidability of Japaridze's polymodal logic". Advances in Modal Logic 7 (2008), pages 289-304.
- L.D. Beklemishev, J.J. Joosten and M. Vervoort, "A finitary treatment of the closed fragment of Japaridze's provability logic". Journal of Logic and Computation 15(4) (2005), pages 447-463.
- G. Boolos, "The analytical completeness of Japaridze's polymodal logics". Annals of Pure and Applied Logic 61 (1993), pages 95–111.

== Selected publications ==
- G. Japaridze, "Build your own clarithmetic I: Setup and completeness". Logical Methods in Computer Science 12 (2016), Issue 3, paper 8, pages 1–59.
- G. Japaridze, "Build your own clarithmetic II: Soundness". Logical Methods in Computer Science 12 (2016), Issue 3, paper 12, pages 1–62.
- G. Japaridze, "Introduction to clarithmetic II". Information and Computation 247 (2016), pages 290-312.
- G. Japaridze, "Introduction to clarithmetic III". Annals of Pure and Applied Logic 165 (2014), pages 241-252.
- G. Japaridze, "The taming of recurrences in computability logic through cirquent calculus, Part II". Archive for Mathematical Logic 52 (2013), pages 213-259.
- G. Japaridze, "The taming of recurrences in computability logic through cirquent calculus, Part I". Archive for Mathematical Logic 52 (2013), pages 173-212.
- G. Japaridze, "A new face of the branching recurrence of computability logic". Applied Mathematics Letters 25 (2012), pages 1585-1589.
- G. Japaridze, "A logical basis for constructive systems". Journal of Logic and Computation 22 (2012), pages 605-642.
- G. Japaridze, "Separating the basic logics of the basic recurrences". Annals of Pure and Applied Logic 163 (2012), pages 377-389.
- G. Japaridze, "Introduction to clarithmetic I". Information and Computation 209 (2011), pages 1312-1354.
- G. Japaridze, "From formulas to cirquents in computability logic". Logical Methods in Computer Science 7 (2011), Issue 2, Paper 1, pages 1–55.
- G. Japaridze, "Toggling operators in computability logic". Theoretical Computer Science 412 (2011), pages 971-1004.
- G. Japaridze, "Towards applied theories based on computability logic". Journal of Symbolic Logic 75 (2010), pages 565-601.
- G. Japaridze, "Many concepts and two logics of algorithmic reduction". Studia Logica 91 (2009), pages 1–24.
- G. Japaridze, "In the beginning was game semantics". Games: Unifying Logic, Language and Philosophy. O. Majer, A.-V. Pietarinen and T. Tulenheimo, eds. Springer 2009, pages 249-350.
- G. Japaridze, "Sequential operators in computability logic". Information and Computation 206 (2008), pages 1443-1475.
- G. Japaridze, "Cirquent calculus deepened". Journal of Logic and Computation 18 (2008), pages 983-1028.
- G. Japaridze, "The intuitionistic fragment of computability logic at the propositional level". Annals of Pure and Applied Logic 147 (2007), pages 187-227.
- G. Japaridze, "The logic of interactive Turing reduction". Journal of Symbolic Logic 72 (2007), pages 243-276.
- G. Japaridze, "Intuitionistic computability logic ". Acta Cybernetica 18 (2007), pages 77–113.
- G. Japaridze, "From truth to computability II". Theoretical Computer Science 379 (2007), pages 20–52.
- G. Japaridze, "From truth to computability I". Theoretical Computer Science 357 (2006), pages 100-135.
- G. Japaridze, "Introduction to cirquent calculus and abstract resource semantics". Journal of Logic and Computation 16 (2006), pages 489-532.
- G. Japaridze, "Computability logic: a formal theory of interaction". Interactive Computation: The New Paradigm. D. Goldin, S. Smolka and P. Wegner, eds. Springer Verlag, Berlin 2006, pages 183-223.
- G. Japaridze, "Propositional computability logic II". ACM Transactions on Computational Logic 7 (2006), pages 331-362.
- G. Japaridze, "Propositional computability logic I". ACM Transactions on Computational Logic 7 (2006), pages 302-330.
- G. Japaridze, "Introduction to computability logic". Annals of Pure and Applied Logic 123 (2003), pages 1–99.
- G. Japaridze, "The logic of tasks". Annals of Pure and Applied Logic 117 (2002), pages 261-293.
- G. Japaridze, "The propositional logic of elementary tasks". Notre Dame Journal of Formal Logic 41 (2000), No. 2, pages 171-183.
- G. Japaridze and D. DeJongh, "The logic of provability". In: Handbook of Proof Theory, S. Buss, ed., North-Holland, 1998, pages 475-545.
- G. Japaridze, "A constructive game semantics for the language of linear logic". Annals of Pure and Applied Logic 85 (1997), pages 87–156.
- G. Japaridze, "A simple proof of arithmetical completeness for Pi-1 conservativity logic". Notre Dame Journal of Formal Logic 35 (1994), pages 346-354.
- G. Japaridze, "The logic of arithmetical hierarchy". Annals of Pure and Applied Logic 66 (1994), pages 89–112.
- G. Japaridze, "A generalized notion of weak interpretability and the corresponding modal logic". Annals of Pure and Applied Logic 61 (1993), pages 113-160.
- G. Japaridze, "The logic of linear tolerance". Studia Logica 51 (1992), pages 249-277.
- G. Japaridze, "Predicate provability logic with non-modalized quantifiers". Studia Logica 50 (1991), pages 149-160.
- G. Japaridze, "Decidable and enumerable predicate logics of provability". Studia Logica 49 (1990), pages 7–21.
- S. Artemov and G. Japaridze, "Finite Kripke models and predicate logics of provability". Journal of Symbolic Logic 55 (1990), pages 1090-1098.
- G. Japaridze, "The polymodal logic of provability". Intensional Logics and Logical Structure of Theories. Metsniereba, Tbilisi, 1988, pages 16–48 (Russian).
- S. Artemov and G. Japaridze, "On effective predicate logics of provability". Dokady Mathematics 297 (1987), pages 521-523 (Russian). English translation in: Soviet Mathematics - Doklady 36, pages 478-480.

== See also ==
- Japaridze's Polymodal Logic
