= Diderik Batens =

Belgian logician and epistemologist (born 1944)

- Born: 15 November 1944 (age 81)
- Known for: Fallibilism
- Scientific career
- Fields: Logician and epistemologist
- Institutions: University of Ghent
- Website: logica.ugent.be/~dirk/

Diderik Batens (born 15 November 1944), is a Belgian logician and epistemologist at the University of Ghent, faculty of Arts and Philosophy, department of Philosophy and Moral Sciences. Known chiefly for his work on adaptive and paraconsistent logics, his epistemological views may be broadly characterized as fallibilist.

== Topics ==
- adaptive logics, paraconsistency, classical logic, content guidance, dynamic proofs, inconsistency, inconsistency-adaptive logic, logic, paraconsistent logic, relevant implication, abnormalities, ambiguity, background knowledge, bi-valued semantics, conditional derivation, conjectures, defeasible reasoning, defeasible rules, embedding, ethics.

== Bibliography ==
- Batens, Diderik; van Bendegem, Jean Paul (1988). Theory and experiment recent insights and new perspectives on their relation. Dordrecht: Springer Netherlands. ISBN 9789401077941.
- Batens, Diderik; van Bendegem, Jean Paul; Priest, Graham; Mortensen, Chris (2000). Frontiers of paraconsistent logic. Baldock, Hertfordshire, England Philadelphia, Pennsylvania: Research Studies Press. ISBN 9780863802539.
