= Marco Aiello =

Marco Aiello (born September 3, 1972) is an Italian-German computer scientist, author and professor.

== Early life and professional career ==
In 2002, Aiello obtained his PhD on modal logics of space with applications to document understanding and image retrieval under the supervision of Johan van Benthem and Arnold Smeulders from the University of Amsterdam. The work culminated in the collective work published as the Handbook of Spatial Logic. When he moved to the University of Trento in 2002, he became interested in service-oriented computing and the problem of service composition.

He spent 2017 on sabbatical leave at the University of Macquarie, Sydney, to work on his book about the Web. Inspired by a quote from Alan Kay, the book is a report and interpretation of the history of the Web, analyzing its strengths, weaknesses, and reasons for success.

In 2018, he accepted the offer of the position of professor and head of the service computing department at the Institute for Architecture of Application Systems (IAAS) at the University of Stuttgart. During his tenure at Stuttgart, Aiello's research focused on AI Planning for service composition, AI Planning for robot navigation, topological considerations in smart grids, and green ICT with particular attention to data center operations, microgrids, and electric vehicle interactions.

He is a member of the European Academy of Sciences and Arts, Editor in Chief of the IEEE Transactions on Service Computing, member of the Steering Committee of ICSOC, and Vice-President of Informatics Europe.

=== As an author (selected) ===
- 2003- Reasoning about space: the modal way
- 2007- Handbook of Spatial Logics
- 2013- Energy Intelligent Buildings based on User Activity: a Survey
- 2015- HTN planning: Overview, comparison, and beyond
- 2016- From the grid to the smart grid, topologically
- 2017- Metrics for sustainable data centers
- 2018- The Web Was Done by Amateurs
- 2023 – Enough hot air: the role of immersion cooling
- 2024 – Towards a Framework for Learning of Algorithms: The Case of Learned Comparison Sorts
- 2025 – A Paradigm Shift in Service Research: The Case of Service Composition
