= Josef-Maria Jauch =

Swiss physicist (1914–1974)

Josef Maria Jauch
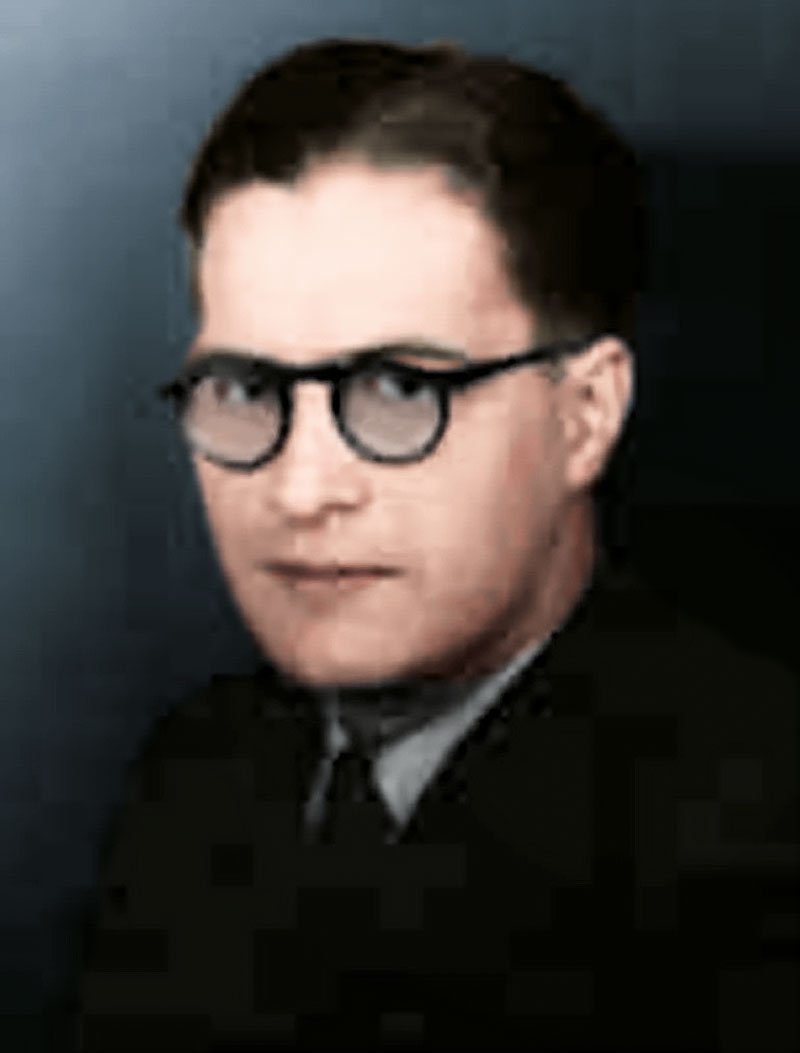
- Born: 20 September 1914; Lucerne, Switzerland
- Died: 30 August 1974 (aged 59); Geneva, Switzerland
- Citizenship: Swiss, American
- Education: University of Minnesota
- Known for: Jauch-Piron theorem, Jauch's theorem
- Scientific career
- Fields: Quantum electrodynamics, foundations of quantum theory, gauge theory
- Thesis: On Contact Transformations and Group Theory in Quantum Mechanical Problems (1940)
- Doctoral advisor: Edward Lee Hill
- Other academic advisors: Wolfgang Pauli
- Doctoral students: Constantin Piron, Kenneth Watson

Josef Maria Jauch (September 20, 1914 in Lucerne – August 30, 1974 in Geneva) was a Swiss/American theoretical physicist, known for his work on quantum electrodynamics and on the foundations of quantum theory, and leader of the "Geneva School" of mathematical physics.

== Biography ==
=== Early life ===
Jauch was born on 20 September 1914 in Lucerne, Switzerland, the son of Josef Alois Jauch (a telegraph operator) and Emma Laura Rosa Jauch (née Conti). He had two older siblings: Adelheid Jauch and Emil Josef Karl Jauch. After his mother died in 1916, his father remarried, and a half-sister was born: Margrit Jauch (Fuchs). At the age of twelve he became fascinated with a fact he found stated in a popular astronomy book, that a body in a circular orbit with period $T$, if brought to a stop, would fall into the central mass in time $T/\sqrt{32}$, which he showed could be derived from Kepler's law. Jauch was also interested in music, studying the violin from age twelve with his father, and then professionally after his father died when he was fifteen, performing chamber music from the age sixteen, and continuing throughout his student years in Zurich.

In 1933 Jauch began studies at the ETH Zürich, paying his fees with loans from friends in Lucerne because he had no money, and taking courses on thermodynamics from Wolfgang Pauli, on probability and graph theory from George Pólya, and on Galois theory and topology from Heinz Hopf. His Diplom Thesis was written under Pauli in 1938 on higher-spin particles in Dirac theory, presenting his results to the Swiss Physical Society in 1938. Upon presenting his results, Pauli reportedly said after a few minutes simply, "Das habe ich mir auch so gedach" ("I thought so too").

=== The War Years ===
With few academic jobs available in Switzerland at the outbreak of World War II, Jauch became a part-time teacher at Trogen in Appenzell, where he received an international exchange fellowship to study a Ph.D. at the University of Minnesota on Pólya's recommendation. There he studied higher symmetries of classical and quantum systems under Edward Lee Hill, for a dissertation entitled On Contact Transformations and Group Theory in Quantum Mechanical Problems, which in particular gave a prototype model for strong interactions using the representation theory of $SU(3)$.

During his doctoral studies in Minneapolis, Jauch met Anna Tonette "Tonia" Hegland, a graduate student in the School of Social Work at the University of Minnesota, and the two were married on 1 January 1940. After receiving his doctorate in 1940, Jauch returned to Zurich to take up a research assistantship offered to him by Pauli at the ETH. However, it was extremely difficult to carry out research in Switzerland during the war: as Heinrich Behnke wrote to Erich Hecke in a letter of 8 March 1940,

"The Paulis would be very happy if you paid them a visit again [in Zurich]. However, it is probably immensely difficult to obtain permission for this. I had an official invitation, and nevertheless had fabulously many difficulties. ... on the day of departure, my nerves had had it."

Soon after Jauch's arrival, the Paulis left Zurich for Princeton, where they stayed for the remainder of the war. Meanwhile, Jauch continued working alongside Pauli's students under Gregor Wentzel, working on pair theory until 1942. During these years, Jauch and his wife Tonia became acquainted with Carl Jung, and met regularly with him for dream analyses. As the war became increasingly dangerous and unpredictable, the Jauchs returned to the United States on the last civilian ship to leave Europe during the war, the SS Drottningholm.

After arriving in the U.S., Jauch looked for a job and received an offer to join Pauli in Princeton as an assistant professor in 1942. There Pauli and Jauch studied the magnetic moment of the neutron, as well as the infrared divergence problem using Dirac field theory, reporting their results to the American Physical Society in 1944. In 1943, Jauch also taught classes in advanced quantum mechanics every other week at Cornell University. During their time in Princeton, Jauch and his wife had three children: Karl (1943), Eldri (1944), and Aletha (1945) (Aletha Solter).

=== After the War ===
In March 1946, Jauch decided to explore new directions by joining Bell Laboratories in Murray Hill, New Jersey as a research scientist for four months, where he studied luminescence in solids. In the autumn of 1946 he was appointed assistant professor at the University of Iowa, becoming a U.S. citizen in 1946. While at Iowa, Jauch continued to perform as a violinist. He also developed a lasting friendship and collaboration with Fritz Rohrlich, with whom he wrote his first book, Theory of Photons and Electrons. Jauch conceived of this book on quantum electrodynamics while on a Fulbright Program research fellowship at Trinity College, Cambridge from 1950 to 1951, and it became noted for its "uncommonly neat and painstaking treatment of details." Upon reading it, Pauli reportedly told Jauch, "Your book... oh, your book... I like better and better." Jauch was soon appointed associate professor, and then full professor at the University of Iowa, and continued working on scattering theory during his time there. During his years at the University of Iowa, Jauch accepted several summer teaching and research positions, including at the University of Chicago, Brandeis University, and Oak Ridge National Laboratory.

In 1958 Jauch and his family returned to Europe, where he spent one year working at CERN (The European Center for Nuclear Research) in Geneva. He spent the following year stationed in London as a scientific liaison officer for the U.S. Office of Naval Research (from 1959 to 1960), where he wrote reports on the state of physics around Europe.

In 1960, the University of Geneva offered Jauch the directorship of the Institute of Theoretical Physics, which he accepted, and where he remained until his death in 1974. Jauch's work at Geneva focused on the foundations of quantum theory. With his student Constantin Piron he proved an important no-go result for hidden variables, now known as the Jauch-Piron theorem. While giving a lecture at CERN on the impossibility of hidden variables in 1963, Jauch met John Stewart Bell, with whom he had "some intense discussion". Jauch pointed out to Bell that Gleason's theorem could be used to rule out a certain class of hidden variables on the basis of only quantum logic, which led to Bell's "other theorem", discovered independently by Simon B. Kochen and Ernst Specker and now known as the Kochen–Specker theorem. Indeed, in his famous paper of 1964 on hidden variables, Bell writes of Gleason's theorem, "I am much indebted to Professor Jauch for drawing my attention to this work." In 1964 Jauch went on to prove what is now known as Jauch's theorem, that electromagnetic gauge invariance can be recovered in quantum theory from an assumption of Galilei covariance. His work on quantum foundations culminated with a book, The Foundations of Quantum Mechanics, published in 1968.

Jauch became a founding member of the European Physical Society at its inception in 1968. In his later work, he turned his attention to the mathematical foundations of equilibrium thermodynamics, producing a novel derivation of the thermodynamic entropy function on the basis of energy conservation. His third and final book, a popular work called Are Quanta Real? A Galilean Dialogue, with a preface by Douglas Hofstadter, was published in 1973. Jauch’s interest in Galileo also inspired him to research Galileo’s trial, and he delivered a lecture at CERN on February 20, 1964, called “The Trial of Galileo Galilei.”

Jauch and his wife divorced in 1969, and he remarried to Mercédès Viviane France Sabine de Cambourg in 1969 (whom he later divorced). He died suddenly of a stroke on August 30, 1974, and was buried in Cimetière de Saint-Georges, Geneva. His final work was the first of a two-part treatise on the mathematical foundations of equilibrium thermodynamics, published posthumously in 1975. No second part was ever published. Among his doctoral students were Gérard Emch, Marcel André Guenin, Andrew Lenard, Constantin Piron, and Kenneth Watson. He was the author of three books and over 80 scientific papers.

== Books ==
- The Theory of Photons and Electrons. The Relativistic Quantum Field Theory of Charged Particles with Spin One-half (with Fritz Rohrlich) (Addison-Wesley Publishing Company, 1955)
- Foundations of Quantum Mechanics (Addison-Wesley Publishing Company, 1968)
- Are Quanta Real? A Galilean Dialogue (Indiana University Press, 1973)
