= Journal of Logic, Language and Information =

- Discipline: Philosophy, mathematics, linguistics, computing
- Language: English

Publication details
- History: 1974-present
- Publisher: Springer Science+Business Media
- Frequency: Quarterly
- Impact factor: 0.829 (2020)

Standard abbreviations
- ISO 4: J. Log. Lang. Inf.

Indexing
- ISSN: 0925-8531 (print); 1572-9583 (web)
- LCCN: 92642631
- OCLC no.: 1044073875

Links
- Journal homepage; Online archive

The Journal of Logic, Language and Information is a quarterly peer-reviewed academic journal covering research on "natural, formal, and programming languages". It is the official journal of the European Association for Logic, Language and Information and was established in 1974. It is published by Springer Science+Business Media and the editor-in-chief is Natasha Alechina (Utrecht University). According to the Journal Citation Reports, the journal has a 2020 impact factor of 0.829.
