= Cointerpretability =

In mathematical logic, cointerpretability is a binary relation on formal theories: a formal theory T is cointerpretable in another such theory S when the language of S can be translated into the language of T in such a way that S proves every formula whose translation is a theorem of T. The "translation" here is required to preserve the logical structure of formulas.

This concept, in a sense dual to interpretability, was introduced by Japaridze (1993), who also proved that, for theories of Peano arithmetic and any stronger theories with computable axiomatizations, cointerpretability is equivalent to $\Sigma_1$-conservativity.

== See also ==
- Cotolerance
- Interpretability logic
- Tolerance (in logic)
