= Journal of Philosophical Logic =

- Discipline: Logic, philosophical logic
- Language: English
- Edited by: Rosalie Iemhoff, Reinhard Muskens, Kai Wehmeier

Publication details
- History: 1972–present
- Publisher: Springer Science+Business Media
- Frequency: Bimonthly
- Open access: Hybrid

Standard abbreviations
- ISO 4: J. Philos. Log.

Indexing
- CODEN: JPLGA7
- ISSN: 0022-3611 (print); 1573-0433 (web)
- LCCN: 72622678
- JSTOR: 00223611
- OCLC no.: 741255937

Links
- Journal homepage; Online archive

The Journal of Philosophical Logic is a bimonthly peer-reviewed academic journal covering all aspects of logic. It was established in 1972 and is published by Springer Science+Business Media. The editors-in-chief are Rosalie Iemhoff (Utrecht University), Reinhard Muskens (University of Amsterdam), and Kai Wehmeier (University of California, Irvine).

== Abstracting and indexing ==
The journal is abstracted and indexed in:

- Arts and Humanities Citation Index
- Current Contents/Arts & Humanities
- EBSCO databases
- International Bibliography of Periodical Literature
- Linguistic Bibliography/Bibliographie Linguistique
- Modern Language Association Database
- Philosopher's Index
- ProQuest databases
- Scopus
- Zentralblatt MATH
