= Michiel van Lambalgen =

Michiel van Lambalgen (born 6 November 1954, Krimpen aan den IJssel) is a professor of logic and cognitive science at the Institute for Logic, Language and Computation and the Department of Philosophy, University of Amsterdam in the Netherlands.

In the 1980s van Lambalgen did research in randomness, and in set theory, where he developed a theory with a randomness predicate R(x) which had important consequences for Gödel's program of finding more primitive axioms from which statements like Axiom of Choice could be derived. After some time felt the subject was "too abstract". Then in the 1990s he moved to artificial intelligence, where he picked up the methodology for studying cognition. In 1999 he spent a sabbatical with Keith Stenning at the University of Edinburgh, where he made contributions to the psychology of reasoning. His research interests include philosophy and the foundations of mathematics, reasoning with uncertainty, the psychology of reasoning, and the cognitive semantics of natural language.
