= Jean Paul Van Bendegem =

Mathematician, philosopher, professor (born 1953)

- Born: 28 March 1953 (age 72); Ghent, Belgium
- Known for: Strict finitism, Philosophy of Mathematical Practice
- Scientific career
- Institutions: Vrije Universiteit Brussel
- Website: www.vub.ac.be/CLWF/members/jean/

Jean Paul Van Bendegem (born 28 March 1953 in Ghent) is a mathematician, a philosopher of science, and a professor at the Vrije Universiteit Brussel in Brussels.

== Career ==
Van Bendegem received his master's degree in mathematics in 1976. Afterwards, he went to study philosophy. He attended lectures on the philosophy of mathematics from Leo Apostel. He received his master's degree in philosophy in 1979.

Van Bendegem wrote his PhD thesis in philosophy on the subject of finitism under the supervision of Diderik Batens while at Ghent University. He defended his thesis in 1983. The content of the thesis was on notation systems, number theory, analysis, physics and logic in a finite empirical framework.

Van Bendegem was the dean of the faculty of Arts and philosophy, and was until his retirement in September 2018 head of the CLPS (Centre for Logic and Philosophy of Science) at the same university.

He is an honorary chairman of SKEPP (Research Society for Critical Evaluation of Pseudoscience and the Paranormal), an organisation that is prepared to pay 10,000 euros to anyone who can prove the validity of a paranormal claim.

Van Bendegem is the university's representative to the CNRL–NCNL (French: Centre National de Recherches de Logique, Dutch: Nationaal Centrum voor Navorsingen in de Logica, English: National Centre for Investigations in Logic). He is chief editor of their quarterly magazine Logique et Analyse.

In mathematics, he is a strict finitist.

== Bibliography ==
=== Books ===
- van Bendegem, Jean Paul (1987). Finite, empirical mathematics, outline of a model. Ghent, Belgium: Ghent University. OCLC 23654274.
- van Bendegem, Jean Paul; Batens, Diderik (1988). Theory and experiment recent insights and new perspectives on their relation. Dordrecht: Springer Netherlands. ISBN 9789401077941.
- van Bendegem, Jean Paul; Restivo, Sal; Fisher, Ronald (1993). Math worlds: philosophical and social studies of mathematics and mathematics education. Albany: State University of New York Press. ISBN 9780791413302.
- van Bendegem, Jean Paul (1998). Jaarboek seksualiteit, relaties, geboorteregeling 1999. Ghent, Belgium: CGSO.
- van Bendegem, Jean Paul; Batens, Diderik; Priest, Graham; Mortensen, Chris (2000). Frontiers of paraconsistent logic. Baldock, Hertfordshire, England Philadelphia, Pennsylvania: Research Studies Press. ISBN 9780863802539.
- van Bendegem, Jean Paul; Aerts, Diederik; Gontier, Nathalie (2006). Evolutionary epistemology, language and culture a non-adaptationist, systems theoretical approach. Dordrecht: Springer. ISBN 9781402033940.
- van Bendegem, Jean Paul; van Kerkhove, Bart (2007). Perspectives on mathematical practices: bringing together philosophy of mathematics, sociology of mathematics, and mathematics education. Dordrecht: Springer. ISBN 9781402050343.
- van Bendegem, Jean Paul; François, Karen (2011). Philosophical dimensions in mathematics education. New York London: Springer. ISBN 9781441943972.
