= Constantin Piron =

Belgian physicist

Constantin Piron (1932, Paris - 9 May 2012, Lausanne) was a Belgian physicist who worked for most of his career in Switzerland.

In 1963 Piron earned his doctor of science degree from the University of Lausanne under the direction of Ernst Stueckelberg and Josef-Maria Jauch with a thesis on quantum logic, "Axiomatique quantique". He developed Jauch's methods (called the Geneva approach) for the foundations of quantum mechanics.

Piron's theorem (1964) is a famous representation theorem for quantum lattices.

He was appointed assistant professor in the physics department of the University of Geneva in 1969 and professor ordinarius in 1974. He retired in 2000.

== Publications ==
- Observables in General Quantum Theory: Lectures Delivered at the International School of Physics "Enrico Fermi", Foundations of Quantum Mechanics, Institut de physique théorique, 1970
- Foundations of Quantum Physics, W.A. Benjamin Inc., Massachusetts, 1976
- Mécanique quantique: bases et applications, Presses polytechniques et universitaires romandes, 1990
- Méthodes quantiques : Champs, N-corps, diffusion, Presses polytechniques et universitaires romandes.
