= Renate Bartsch =

German philosopher of language

Renate Irmtraut Bartsch (born 12 December 1939) is a German philosopher of language. She was a professor at the University of Amsterdam from 1974 to 2004.

== Career ==
Bartsch was born on 12 December 1939 in Königsberg. She earned her doctorate at Heidelberg University in 1967 with a thesis titled: "Grundzüge einer empiristischen Bedeutungstheorie". Bartsch worked as a professor of philosophy of language at the University of Amsterdam from 1974 until her retirement in 2004.

Bartsch became a member of the Royal Netherlands Academy of Arts and Sciences in 2000.
