= German Association for Mathematical Logic and for Basic Research in the Exact Sciences =

Deutsche Vereinigung für mathematische Logik und für Grundlagenforschung der exakten Wissenschaften
- DVMLG
- Abbreviation: DVMLG
- Formation: 1962; 64 years ago
- Type: registered association (eingetragener Verein)
- Region served: German-speaking countries
- Vorsitzende (President): Katrin Tent
- Parent organization: DLMPST
- Website: DVMLG Official website

The German Association for Mathematical Logic and for Basic Research in the Exact Sciences (German: Deutsche Vereinigung für mathematische Logik und für Grundlagenforschung der exakten Wissenschaften; DVMLG) is the learned society representing the interdisciplinary research area of Logic (within the disciplines of Mathematics, Philosophy, Computer Science, and Linguistics) in German-speaking countries. It was founded in 1962 by Wilhelm Ackermann, Gisbert Hasenjaeger, Hans Hermes, Jürgen von Kempski, Paul Lorenzen, Arnold Schmidt, and Kurt Schütte. Its members are researchers in Mathematical Logic, Philosophical Logic, and Theoretical Computer Science. Biannually, the DVMLG organises the Colloquium Logicum, an international research conference in logic. The DVMLG forms the National Committee for Logic, Methodology and Philosophy of Science representing the Ordinary Member Germany within the Division of Logic, Methodology and Philosophy of Science and Technology (DLMPST).

== Governance ==
The current President of the DVMLG is Katrin Tent (since 2022). The Board consists of the President and five other members: Matthias Aschenbrenner (Vice President; stellvertretende Vorsitzende), Manuel Bodirsky, Leon Horsten, Benedikt Löwe, Heike Mildenberger.

=== Past Presidents ===
	Name	Term of office
1st President	Arnold Schmidt	1962–1967
2nd President	Hans Hermes	1967–1970
3rd President	Arnold Oberschelp	1970–1976
4th President	Gert H. Müller	1976–1981
5th President	Michael M. Richter	1981–1985
6th President	Justus Diller	1985
7th President	Klaus Potthoff	1985–1990
8th President	Hans-Georg Carstens	1990–1992
9th President	Helmut Pfeiffer	1992–1996
10th President	Sabine Koppelberg	1996–2000
11th President	Jörg Flum	2000–2002
12th President	Peter Koepke	2002–2008
13th President	Ulrich Kohlenbach	2008–2012
14th President	Benedikt Löwe	2012-2022
15th President	Katrin Tent	since 2022

=== Past Board members ===
The following persons were among the members of the DVMLG Board in the past: Wilhelm Ackermann (1962), Matthias Aschenbrenner (since 2021; Vice President since 2022), Gisbert Hasenjaeger (1962–1970), Hans Hermes (1962–1972; President 1967–1970), Paul Lorenzen (1962–1972), Kurt Schütte (1962–1971), Arnold Oberschelp (1965–1979; President 1970–1976), Wolfgang Stegmüller (1965–1969), Ernst Specker (1970–1977), Heinz-Dieter Ebbinghaus (1972–1981), Anne Troelstra (1977–2000), Michael M. Richter (1981–1986; President 1981–1985), Johann Makowsky (1998–2010), Ulrich Kohlenbach (2006–2012; Vice President 2006–2008; President 2008–2012), Benedikt Löwe (seit 2006; Vice President 2008–2012; President 2012-2022), Sy David Friedman (2012–2014), Katrin Tent (since 2012; Vice President 2016-2022; President since 2022).

== Activities ==
The DVMLG organises a biannual conference called Colloquium Logicum. Since 2002, there is a PhD Colloquium organised as part of the Colloquium Logicum where excellent doctoral dissertations in logic are presented (based on nominations by the membership of the DVMLG). Past Colloquia Logica took place in Kiel (1988), Bielefeld (1990), Münster (1992), Neuseddin (1994), Berlin (1998), Dresden (2000), Münster (2002), Heidelberg (2004), Bonn (2006), Darmstadt (2008), Münster (2010), Paderborn (2012), Neubiberg (2014), Hamburg (2016), Bayreuth (2018), Konstanz (2022), and Vienna (2024).

Colloquium Logicum 2012 was part of the German activities of the Alan Turing Year, celebrating the centenary of Alan Turing. As part of these celebrations, the DVMLG organised a theatre tour of the University Players Hamburg performing Hugh Whitemore's play Breaking the Code in Germany and the Netherlands. The Colloquium Logicum in Konstanz was scheduled for September 2020, but was postponed to for two years due to the COVID-19 pandemic.

Together with the German Mathematical Society (DMV), the DVMLG organises the Fachgruppe Mathematische Logik (Section Mathematical Logic). The DVMLG has a publication agreement with the scientific publishing house Wiley and has been responsible for the scientific management of the journal Mathematical Logic Quarterly since 2011.

Since 2024, the DVMLG awards the Ernst Zermelo Ring, an honour given every four years to a researcher in the foundations of mathematics who had a sustained influence on the development of the field and is expected to continue to remain active and influential. The first ringbearer is Ulrich Kohlenbach, honoured for his systematic development of proof mining.
