= Dieter Rödding =

German mathematician

- Born: 24 August 1937; Hattingen, Ruhr, Germany
- Died: 4 June 1984 (aged 46); Münster, Germany
- Education: Westphalian Wilhelms-University
- Known for: Classification of recursive functions
- Scientific career
- Fields: Mathematical logic; model theory
- Workplaces: Westphalian Wilhelms-University
- Thesis: Darstellungssätze über die im Kalmâar-Csillag'schen Sinne elementaren Funktionen (1961)
- Doctoral advisor: Gisbert Hasenjaeger
- Doctoral students: Egon Börger; Heinz-Dieter Ebbinghaus; Helmut Schwichtenberg

Dieter Rödding (24 August 1937 in Hattingen (Ruhr) – 4 June 1984 in Münster) was a German mathematician whose main research interest was mathematical logic.

Dieter Rödding was born on 24 August 1937 in Hattingen, Ruhr, Germany. In 1956, Rödding began his studies at the Westphalian Wilhelms-University in Münster, Germany. In 1961, he received his doctorate with the dissertation "Representative sentences about (in the Kalmár-Czillagian sense) elementary functions", supervised by Gisbert Hasenjaeger. In 1964, he completed his habilitation at Münster with the thesis "Theory of recursivity over the domain of finite sets of finite rank". In 1966, he succeeded Hans Hermes as the Chair and Director of the Institute of Mathematical Logic and Fundamental Research at the Westphalian Wilhelms-University, founded by Heinrich Scholz in 1936.

Rödding became known through his results on the classification of recursive functions, on recursive types of classical predicate logic, on Scholz's spectrum problem, as well as on quantifiers in predicate logic, and on the arithmetical hierarchy (also known as the Kleene–Mostowski hierarchy). Rödding was one of the first to use a machine-oriented concept of complexity for the investigation of recursive functions and logical decision problems, before the establishment of computer science as an academic field.

His students included Egon Börger, Hans Kleine Büning, Hans Georg Carstens, Elmar Cohors-Fresenborg, Heinz-Dieter Ebbinghaus, Thomas Ottmann, Lutz Priese, and Helmut Schwichtenberg.

A complete list of Rödding's publications can be found in an obituary written by his student Egon Börger.
