= Ulrich Kohlenbach =

German mathematician

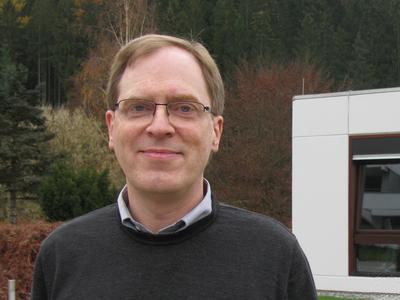
- Kohlenbach at Oberwolfach, 2011
- Born: 27 July 1962 (age 64); Frankfurt am Main, Germany
- Education: Goethe University Frankfurt
- Known for: Proof mining Higher-order reverse mathematics
- Awards: Kurt Gödel Research Prize (2011); ICM Speaker (2018); Ernst Zermelo Ring (2024)
- Scientific career
- Fields: Mathematical logic, proof theory
- Workplaces: Technische Universität Darmstadt
- Doctoral advisor: Horst Luckhardt

President of the Association for Symbolic Logic
- In office 2016–2018
- Preceded by: Alasdair Urquhart
- Succeeded by: Julia Knight

President of the DVMLG
- In office 2008–2012
- Preceded by: Peter Koepke
- Succeeded by: Benedikt Löwe

Ulrich Wilhelm Kohlenbach (born 27 July 1962 in Frankfurt am Main) is a German mathematician and professor of algebra and logic at the Technische Universität Darmstadt. His research interests lie in the field of proof mining.

Kohlenbach was president of the German Association for Mathematical Logic and for Basic Research in the Exact Sciences (DVMLG) from 2008 to 2012 and president of the Association for Symbolic Logic from 2016 to 2018.

== Life ==
He graduated ('Abitur') from Lessing-Gymnasium (High School) in 1980 and completed his studies of mathematics, philosophy, and linguistics with a diplom from the Goethe University Frankfurt. During his studies he received a scholarship from the Studienstiftung des deutschen Volkes. At the same university, he received his Ph.D. in 1990 under the supervision of Horst Luckhardt and passed his habilitation ('venia legendi') in mathematics five years later. During the academic year 1996/1997 he was a visiting assistant professor at the University of Michigan. In 1997, he became an associate professor at Aarhus University where he worked until 2004. Kohlenbach is now a full professor at the Technische Universität Darmstadt.

He is married to Gabriele Bahl-Kohlenbach with whom he has a daughter.

In 2011, he received the prestigious Kurt Gödel Research Prize of the Kurt Gödel Society. He was an invited speaker at the 2018 International Congress of Mathematicians in Rio de Janeiro. In 2024, he was selected as the first ringbearer of the Ernst Zermelo Ring.
