= Egon Börger =

German computer scientist (born 1930)

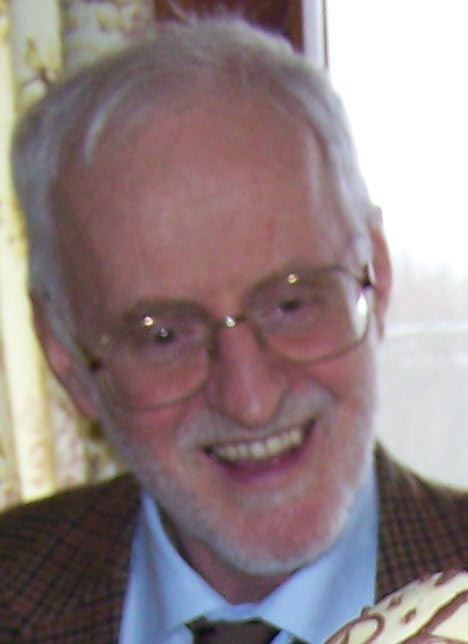
- Born: 13 May 1946 (age 80); Bad Laer, Osnabrück, Lower Saxony, Germany
- Education: Sorbonne; Université Catholique de Louvain; University of Münster
- Known for: Abstract State Machines
- Awards: Humboldt Research Award (2007)
- Scientific career
- Fields: Computer science
- Workplaces: University of Pisa
- Thesis: Reduktionstypen in Krom- und Hornformeln (1971)
- Doctoral advisor: Dieter Rödding

Egon Börger (born 13 May 1946) is a German-born computer scientist based in Italy.

== Life and work ==
Börger was born in Bad Laer, Westphalia, Lower Saxony, Germany. Between 1965 and 1971 he studied at the Sorbonne, Paris (France), Université Catholique de Louvain, Institut Supérieur de Philosophie de Louvain and University of Münster (Germany). Between 1972 and 1976, he was at the Università di Salerno in Italy, where he taught the first courses in the newborn Computer Science Degree. Since 1985 he has held a Chair in computer science at the University of Pisa, Italy. Since September 2010, he has been an elected member of the Academia Europaea.

Egon Börger is a pioneer of applying logical methods in computer science. He is co-founder of the international conference series CSL. He is also one of the founders of the Abstract State Machines (ASM) formal method for accurate and controlled design and analysis of computer-based systems and cofounder of the series of international ASM workshops, which in 2008 merged with the regular meetings of the B and Z User Groups to form the international ABZ conference.

Börger contributed to the theoretical foundations of the method and initiated its industrial applications in a variety of fields, in particular programming languages, System architecture, requirements and software (re-)engineering, control systems, protocols, web services. To this date, he is one of the leading scientists in ASM-based modeling and verification technology, which he has crucially shaped by his activities. In 2007, he received the Humboldt Research Award.

Festschrift volumes were produced for Börger's 60th, 75th, and 80th birthdays.

== Selected publications ==
- Egon Börger, Computability, Complexity, Logic, North-Holland, Amsterdam, 1989. Translated from the German original from 1985, Italian translation Bollati-Borighieri 1989.
- Egon Börger, The Classical Decision Problem (co-authored by E. Graedel and Y. Gurevich), Springer-Verlag, 1997. ISBN 3-540-57073-X; 2nd Edition as "Universitext", Springer-Verlag, 2001. ISBN 3-540-42324-9
- Egon Börger, Java and the Java Virtual Machine: Definition, Verification, Validation (co-authored by R. Staerk and J. Schmid), Springer-Verlag, 2001. ISBN 3-540-42088-6
- Egon Börger and Robert Stärk, Abstract State Machines: A Method for High-Level System Design and Analysis, Springer-Verlag, 2003. ISBN 3-540-00702-4
- Egon Börger and Alexander Raschke, Modeling Companion for Software Pratitioners, Springer, 2018. ISBN 978-3-662-56639-8, doi:10.1007/978-3-662-56641-1
- Egon Börger and Vincenzo Gervasi, Structures of Computing: A Guide to Practice-Oriented Theory, Springer Nature, 2024. ISBN 978-3-031-54357-9, doi:10.1007/978-3-031-54358-6
