= Alan Turing Year =

International observance

- Discipline: Artificial intelligence Cognitive science Computer science Computing; Cryptography; Developmental biology Mathematics; Philosophy of mind Psychology

Publication details
- Publisher: Turing Centenary Advisory Committee
- History: 2012

The Alan Turing Year, 2012, marked the celebration of the life and scientific influence of Alan Turing during the centenary of his birth on 23 June 1912. Turing had an important influence on computing, computer science, artificial intelligence, developmental biology, and the mathematical theory of computability and made important contributions to code-breaking during the Second World War. The Alan Turing Centenary Advisory committee (TCAC) was originally set up by Professor S. Barry Cooper

The international impact of Turing's work is reflected in the list of countries in which Alan Turing Year was celebrated, including: Bolivia, Brazil, Canada, China, Czech Republic, France, Germany, Hong Kong, India, Israel, Italy, Netherlands, Mexico, New Zealand, Norway, Philippines, Portugal, Spain, Switzerland, the U.K., and the U.S.A. 41+ countries were involved.

== Events ==
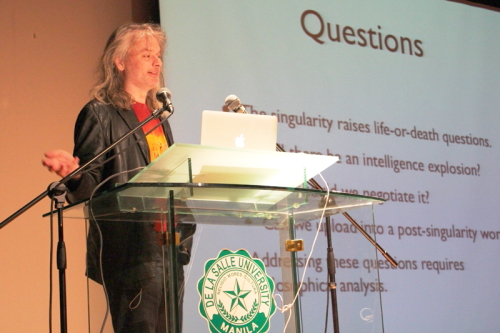
David Chalmers on stage for the Turing 2012 conference at De La Salle University, Manila, 27 March 2012

A number of major events took place throughout the year. Some of these were linked to places with special significance in Turing's life, such as Cambridge University, the University of Manchester, Bletchley Park, Princeton University. The Association for Computing Machinery was involved from June to September 2012. Twelve museums were involved including in Germany and Brazil. Artists, musicians and poets took part in the celebrations internationally.

Events included the 2012 Computability in Europe conference, as well as Turing Centenary activities organized or sponsored by the British Computer Society, the Association for Symbolic Logic, British Colloquium for Theoretical Computer Science, the British Society for the History of Mathematics, the Association for Computing Machinery, British Logic Colloquium, Society for the Study of Artificial Intelligence and the Simulation of Behaviour, the Computer Conservation Society, the Computer Society of India, the Bletchley Park Trust, the European Association for Computer Science Logic, the European Association for Theoretical Computer Science, International Association for Computing and Philosophy, the Department of Philosophy at De La Salle University-Manila, the John Templeton Foundation, the Kurt Gödel Society, the IEEE Symposium on Logic in Computer Science, the Science Museum, and Turing100in2012. The Alan Turing Centenary Conference was held at the University of Manchester during June 2012.

Alan Turing Year is known on Twitter as Alan Turing Years. @alanturingyear.

== Organisers ==
The Turing Year was coordinated by the Turing Centenary Advisory Committee (TCAC), representing a range of expertise and organisational involvement in the 2012 celebrations. Members of TCAC include Honorary President, Sir John Dermot Turing; The Chair and founder of the committee, mathematician and author of Alan Turing - His Work and Impact S. Barry Cooper; Turing's biographer Andrew Hodges; Wendy Hall, first person from outside North America elected President of the Association for Computing Machinery in July 2008; Simon Singh; Hugh Loebner sponsor of the Loebner Prize for Artificial Intelligence (annual science contest based on the famous Turing test) cyberneticist Kevin Warwick, author of 'March of the Machines' and 'I, Cyborg', and committee member Daniela Derbyshire, who is also handling international co-ordination of marketing and publicity.

== UK publicity ==
Examples include:

- The Royal Mail issued a UK commemorative stamp for the Turing Centenary.
- The Imitation Game: how Benedict Cumberbatch brought Turing to life, The Guardian, Tuesday, 7 October 2014.
- De-coding the Turing family, Prof. S. Barry Cooper, The Guardian, Tue 17 April 2012.
- Alan Turing Year - the Establishment still doesn't get it, Prof. S. Barry Cooper, The Guardian, Tuesday, 22 January 2013.
- Alan Turing and the bullying of Britain's geeks, Prof. S. Barry Cooper, The Guardian, Wednesday, 20 June 2012.
- Playing Monopoly with Alan Turing, Prof. S. Barry Cooper, The Guardian, Monday, 24 September 2012.
- Alan Turing: "I am building a brain." Half a century later, its successor beat Kasparov, Prof. S. Barry Cooper, The Guardian, Monday 14 May 2012.
- Google doodle becomes an enigma in honour of Alan Turing, The Daily Telegraph, Saturday 23 June 2012.
- Blinc digital arts festival's tribute to Alan Turing, BBC News, Saturday, 27 October 2012.
- The other Turing test: Codebreaker's beloved Monopoly pays him the ultimate compliment, The Independent, Saturday 8 September 2012.
- Maths and nature link 'proven' by Manchester scientists, BBC News, 28 October 2012.
- How did the leopard get its spots? Codebreaker Alan Turing was right all along, The Daily Telegraph.
- The Queen hails 'genius' of Alan Turing on visit to WWII codebreaking HQ at Bletchley Park, Manchester Evening News, Friday, 15 July 2011.
