= Makowsky =

Makowsky is a surname. Notable people with the surname include:

- Alexander Makowsky (1833–1908), Austrian botanist, geologist and paleontologist
- Bruce Makowsky, American real estate developer
- Gene Makowsky (born 1973), Canadian politician
- Johann Makowsky (born 1948), Hungarian-born Swiss mathematician
- Lucas Makowsky (born 1987), Canadian speed skater
