= Computability in Europe =

Scientific organization

Association Computability in Europe
- Association CiE logo
- Abbreviation: ACiE
- Formation: 2008; 18 years ago
- Type: INGO
- President: Elvira Mayordomo
- Website: www.acie.eu

The Association Computability in Europe (ACiE) is an international organization of mathematicians, logicians, computer scientists, philosophers, theoretical physicists and others interested in new developments in computability and in their underlying significance for the real world. ACiE aims to widen understanding and appreciation of the importance of the concepts and techniques of computability theory, and to support the development of a multi-disciplinary community of researchers focused on computability-related topics. The ACiE positions itself at the interface between applied and fundamental research, prioritising mathematical approaches to computational barriers.

ACiE originated as a research network called Computability in Europe (CiE) in 2003, became a conference series in 2005, and the ACiE was formed in 2008.

== Association ==
ACiE was founded in Athens, Greece in 2008. Its founding president (2008 to 2015) was S. Barry Cooper; its current president is Elvira Mayordomo and its current secretary general is Giuseppe Primiero. The association is promoting the development, particularly in Europe, of computability-related science, ranging over mathematics, computer science, and applications in various natural and engineering sciences such as physics and biology. This also includes the promotion of the study of philosophy and history of computing as it relates to questions of computability. ACiE is an international member of the Division for Logic, Methodology and Philosophy of Science and Technology of the International Union of History and Philosophy of Science (DLMPST/IUHPST).

=== Past and Present Presidents ===
| | Name | Term of office |
|---|---|---|
| 1st President | S. Barry Cooper | 2008–2015 |
| 2nd President | Dag Normann | 2015–2016 |
| 3rd President | Paola Bonizzoni | 2016–2020 |
| 4th President | Elvira Mayordomo | 2020–2026 |

=== Members of the Association Council ===
Council of the Association of Computability in Europe
| Name | Role | Term of office |
|---|---|---|
| Marcella Anselmo | Treasurer, Council Member | 2021 – 2027 |
| Arnold Beckmann | Council Member | 2017 – 2025 |
| Paola Bonizzoni | Council Member | 2020 – 2028 |
| Merlin Carl | Council Member | 2018 – 2026 |
| Liesbeth De Mol | Member-at-Large EC, Council Member | 2017 – 2025 |
| Gianluca Della Vedova | Council Member | 2018 – 2026 |
| Johanna Franklin | Council Member | 2019 – 2027 |
| Ekaterina Fokina | Council Member | 2022 – 2026 |
| Lorenzo Galeotti | Council Member | 2020 – 2024 |
| Daniel Graça | Council Member | 2017 – 2025 |
| Jarkko Kari | Council Member | 2018 – 2026 |
| Sandra Kiefer | Council Member | 2022 – 2026 |
| Benedikt Löwe | Council Member | 2017 – 2025 |
| Janos Makowsky | Council Member | 2016 – 2024 |
| Florin Manea | Chair of the CS Steering Committee, Council Member | 2016 – 2024 |
| Barnaby Martin | Secretary General, Council Member, Past Member-at-Large EC | 2017 – 2025 |
| Elvira Mayordomo | President | 2018 – 2026 |
| Dag Normann | Council Member, Past President and Treasurer | 2016 – 2024 |
| Arno Pauly | Member-at-Large, Council Member | 2019 – 2027 |
| Olga Petrovska | Membership Secretary, Council Member | 2023 – 2027 |
| Giuseppe Primiero | Council Member, Past Secretary General | 2016 – 2024 |
| Paul Shafer | Council Member | 2023 – 2027 |
| Mariya Soskova | Council Member, Member-at-Large EC | 2017 – 2025 |
| Martin Ziegler | Council Member | 2016 – 2024 |

Former members of the Council of the Association are: Alison Pease and Olivier Bournez (Past Membership Secretary).

=== Special Interest Groups ===
The Association has three Special Interest Groups (SIGs): Women in Computability (WiC), Transfinite Computations (TraC), and History and Philosophy of Computing (HaPoC). SIGWiC has been organising the workshop Women in Computability at the CiE conferences since 2007; HaPoC also organizes two separate conference series: History and Philosophy of Computing and History and Philosophy of Programming.

=== S. Barry Cooper Prize ===
In memory of the visionary engagement of its founding president, the association established the S. Barry Cooper Prize honouring a researcher who has contributed to a broad understanding and foundational study of computability by outstanding results, by seminal and lasting theory building, by exceptional service to the research communities involved, or by a combination of these. The inaugural S. Barry Cooper Prize was awarded in 2020 to Bruno Courcelle.

== Conference series ==
The association grew out of the major international conference series Computability in Europe (CiE); the first CiE conference was held in Amsterdam in June 2005. CiE is an interdisciplinary annual conference series promoting the development of computability-related science, ranging over mathematics, computer science, and applications in various natural and engineering sciences such as physics and biology. The conference scope also includes the study of philosophy and history of computing as it relates to questions of computability.

- CiE 2005: New Computational Paradigms, Amsterdam, The Netherlands
- CiE 2006: Logical approaches to computational barriers, Swansea, Wales
- CiE 2007: Computation and Logic in the Real World, Siena, Italy
- CiE 2008: Logic and Theory of Algorithms, Athens, Greece
- CiE 2009: Mathematical Theory and Computational Practice, Heidelberg, Germany
- CiE 2010: Programs, Proofs, Processes, Ponta Delgada (Azores), Portugal
- CiE 2011: Models of Computation in Context, Sofia, Bulgaria
- CiE 2012: How the World Computes, Cambridge, England
- CiE 2013: The Nature of Computation: Logic, Algorithms, Applications, Milan, Italy
- CiE 2014: Language, Life, Limits, Budapest, Hungary
- CiE 2015: Evolving Computability, Bucharest, Romania
- CiE 2016: Pursuit of the Universal, Paris, France
- CiE 2017: Unveiling Dynamics and Complexity, Turku, Finland
- CiE 2018: Sailing Routes in the World of Computation, Kiel, Germany
- CiE 2019: Computing with Foresight and Industry , Durham, England.
- CiE 2020: Beyond the Horizon of Computability, Salerno, Italy (held as a fully online conference).
- CiE 2021: Connecting with Computability, Gent, Belgium (online).
- CiE 2022: Revolutions and Revelations in Computability, Swansea, Wales.
- CiE 2023: Unity of Logic and Computation, Batumi, Georgia.

The current chair of the Steering Committee of the conference series is Florin Manea; his predecessors were Benedikt Löwe (2005–2013) and Arnold Beckmann (2013–2016).

== Book series and journal ==
ACiE has editorial responsibility for the Springer book series Theory and Applications of Computability and the journal Computability published by IOS Press.
