= S. Barry Cooper =

English mathematician and computability theorist

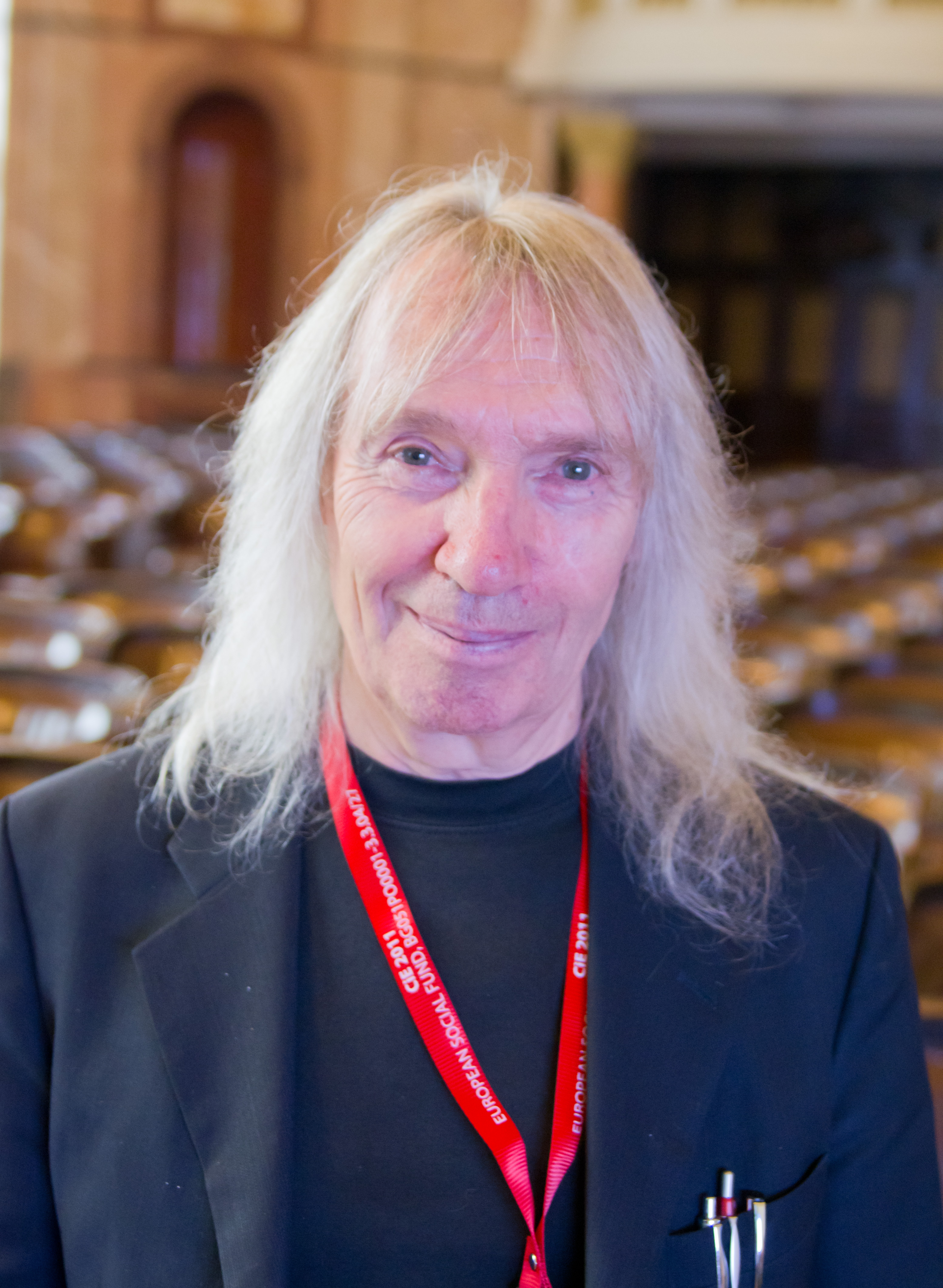
- Born: 9 October 1943; Bognor Regis, West Sussex, England
- Died: 26 October 2015 (aged 72)
- Education: Jesus College, Oxford; University of Leicester
- Known for: Alan Turing Year
- Awards: Doctor honoris causa (Sofia University, 2011)
- Scientific career
- Workplaces: University of Leeds
- Thesis: Degrees of Unsolvability (1970)
- Doctoral advisor: Reuben Goodstein; C.E.M. Yates
- Doctoral students: Mariya Soskova

1st President of Association CiE
- In office 2008–2015
- Succeeded by: Dag Normann

S. Barry Cooper (9 October 1943 – 26 October 2015) was an English mathematician and computability theorist. He was a professor of pure mathematics at the University of Leeds.

== Early life and education ==
Cooper grew up in Bognor Regis and attended Chichester High School for Boys, during which time he played scrum-half for the under-15s England rugby team.

Cooper graduated from Jesus College, Oxford, in 1966 and in 1970 received his Ph.D. from the University of Leicester under the supervision of Reuben Goodstein and C.E.M. Yates, with a thesis entitled Degrees of Unsolvability.

== Academic career ==
Cooper was appointed Lecturer in the School of Mathematics at the University of Leeds in 1969, where he remained for the rest of his career. He was promoted to Reader in Mathematical Logic in 1991 and to Professor of Pure Mathematics in 1996. In 2011, he was awarded an honorary doctorate at the University of Sofia "St. Kliment Ohridski".

His book Computability Theory made the technical research area accessible to a new generation of students. He was a leading mover of the return to basic questions of the kind considered by Alan Turing, and of interdisciplinary developments related to computability. He was President of the Association Computability in Europe, and Chair of the Turing Centenary Advisory Committee (TCAC), which co-ordinated the Alan Turing Year. The book Alan Turing: His Work and Impact, edited by Cooper and Jan van Leeuwen, won the Association of American Publishers' R. R. Hawkins Award.

Cooper was a member of the editorial board for The Rutherford Journal.

== Interests ==
Cooper was a keen long-distance runner, and was also interested in jazz and improvised music, founding Leeds Jazz and being involved in the Termite Club.

In the 1970s, he was also a leading figure in the Chile Solidarity Campaign, welcoming Chilean refugees to Leeds.

== Death ==
Cooper died on 26 October 2015 after a short illness.

== Selected publications ==
- S. B. Cooper, 2004. Computability Theory, Chapman & Hall/CRC. ISBN 1-58488-237-9
- S. B. Cooper; J. van Leeuwen (eds.), 2013. Alan Turing – His Work and Impact, New York: Elsevier, ISBN 978-0-123-86980-7
- S. B. Cooper, B. Löwe, A. Sorbi (eds.), 2008. New Computational Paradigms – Changing Conceptions of What is Computable, Springer. ISBN 978-1-58488-237-4
- Cooper, S. B.; Harrington, L.; Lachlan, A. H.; Lempp, S.; Soare, R. I. (1991). "The d.r.e. degrees are not dense". Annals of Pure and Applied Logic. 55 (2): 125–151. doi:10.1016/0168-0072(91)90005-7.
- Cooper, S. B. (2006). "Definability as hypercomputational effect" (PDF). Applied Mathematics and Computation. 178: 72–82. arXiv:0904.2874. doi:10.1016/j.amc.2005.09.072. S2CID 1487739. Archived from the original (PDF) on 24 July 2011.
- Cooper, S. B. (2004). "The incomputable Alan Turing". Alan Mathison Turing 2004: A celebration of his life and achievements, Manchester University, 5 June 2004. ScienceOpen. arXiv:1206.1706. doi:10.14236/ewic/TUR2004.2.
- Cooper, S. B.; Odifreddi, P. (2003). "Incomputability in Nature". In S. B. Cooper; S. S. Goncharov (eds.). Computability and Models: Perspectives East and West (PDF). Plenum Publishers, New York, Boston, Dordrecht, London, Moscow. pp. 137–160. Archived from the original (PDF) on 24 July 2011.
- Cooper, S. B. (1999). "Clockwork or Turing U/universe?". In S. B. Cooper; J. K. Truss (eds.). Models and Computability (PDF). London Mathematical Society Lecture Notes Series 259, Cambridge University Press, Cambridge, New York, Melbourne. pp. 63–116.

Academic offices
| Preceded by New position | President of the Association CiE; 2008-2015 | Succeeded by Dag Normann |
