= John Truss =

British mathematician (born 1947)

- Born: April 1947 (age 79); Watford, Hertfordshire, England
- Education: King's College, Cambridge (BA); University of Leeds (PhD)
- Spouse: Priscilla Mary Grasby (m. 1967; div. 2003)
- Children: 4; including Liz
- Scientific career
- Fields: Pure mathematics
- Workplaces: Paisley College of Technology; University of Leeds

John Kenneth Truss (born April 1947) is an English mathematician. He is an emeritus professor of pure mathematics at the University of Leeds where he specialises in mathematical logic, infinite permutation groups, homogeneous structures and model theory. Truss began his career as a junior research fellow at the University of Oxford before holding a series of academic positions and lastly joining the University of Leeds. He has written books on discrete mathematics (1991) and mathematical analysis (1997) and was co-editor in chief of the Journal of the London Mathematical Society until June 2003. He is the father of the former Prime Minister of the United Kingdom, Liz Truss.

== Early life and family ==
John Truss was born in April 1947. He graduated from King's College, Cambridge, in 1968 and earned his PhD at the University of Leeds in 1973 for a dissertation titled "Some Results about Cardinal Numbers without the Axiom of Choice" which was supervised by Frank Drake. In 1969, he married Priscilla Mary Grasby, a nurse, who he had met while they were students at Cambridge. Together, they have a daughter, Liz Truss, and three sons. Liz Truss has described her parents' politics as "to the left of Labour". Truss and his wife were both supporters of the Campaign for Nuclear Disarmament. They divorced in 2003.

Truss refused to campaign with his daughter on her selection for Conservative candidate for South West Norfolk in the 2010 UK general election.

== Career ==
Truss's first academic position was as a junior research fellow at the Mathematical Institute of the University of Oxford. He then taught at a school in Kidderminster, Worcestershire, before lecturing at Paisley College of Technology from 1979 to 1985. In 1987, he worked at Simon Fraser University in British Columbia, Canada, and later at the University of Leeds where in 1988 with Frank Drake he edited the collected papers of Logic Colloquium '86, held at the University of Hull in 1986.

In 1990, Peter Cameron paid tribute to Truss in his notes on Oligomorphic Permutation Groups in the London Mathematical Society Lecture Notes Series No. 152, for saving him from "making some rash conjectures (by disproving them)", and "notably" for his contribution to the question of what are the possible cycle structures of automorphisms of M? In 1991, Truss published Discrete Mathematics for Computer Scientists which John Bayliss described in The Mathematical Gazette as "masterful and thorough" and getting "rapidly to the heart of some very exciting topics" but felt that it was more of a mathematician's book than a book for computer scientists as claimed by the author. Nonetheless, Bayliss felt that the approach taken by Truss in organising and presenting his material was highly successful in condensing different strands of mathematics so that the author had shown that "discrete mathematics has come of age and is no longer a collection of disparate topics."

In 1999, Truss and S. Barry Cooper, also of the University of Leeds, jointly edited two volumes of papers in the London Mathematical Society Lecture Notes Series arising from the European meeting of the Association for Symbolic Logic in Leeds in July 1997 on sets and proofs and models and computability. The volumes were welcomed by philosopher Graham Priest of the University of Queensland who noted that they concentrated on logic as practiced in mathematics departments with little content of a philosophical or computer science nature, but, possibly as a result, were more coherent than usual for collections of conference papers. By then, Truss and Jonathan Partington were co-editors of the Journal of the London Mathematical Society. They were succeeded on 6 June 2003 by Francis Burstall and John Toland.

== Selected publications ==
=== Books ===
- Truss, J. K. (1991). Discrete Mathematics for Computer Scientists. Addison-Wesley. ISBN 978-0-201-17564-6.
- Truss, J. K. (1997). Foundations of Mathematical Analysis. Clarendon Press. ISBN 978-0-19-853375-7.

=== Edited volumes ===
- Drake, Frank Robert; Truss, J. K., eds. (1988). Logic Colloquium '86: Proceedings of the Colloquium Held in Hull, U.K. July 13-19, 1986. North-Holland Publishing Company. ISBN 978-0-444-70326-2.
- Cooper, S. Barry; Truss, J. K., eds. (1999). Sets and Proofs: Invited Papers from Logic Colloquium '97, European Meeting of the Association for Symbolic Logic, Leeds, July 1997. Cambridge University Press. doi:10.1017/CBO9781107325944. ISBN 978-1-139-88244-6.
- Cooper, S. Barry; Truss, John K., eds. (1999). Models and Computability. London Mathematical Society Lecture Note Series. Cambridge: Cambridge University Press. doi:10.1017/cbo9780511565670. ISBN 978-0-521-63550-9.

=== Journal articles ===
- Truss, J. K. (September 1985). "The group of the countable universal graph". Mathematical Proceedings of the Cambridge Philosophical Society. 98 (2): 213–245. Bibcode:1985MPCPS..98..213T. doi:10.1017/S0305004100063428. ISSN 1469-8064. S2CID 122772888.
- Truss, J. K. (February 1989). "Infinite permutation groups II. Subgroups of small index". Journal of Algebra. 120 (2): 494–515. doi:10.1016/0021-8693(89)90212-3.
- Truss, J. K. (July 1992). "Generic Automorphisms of Homogeneous Structures". Proceedings of the London Mathematical Society. s3-65 (1): 121–141. doi:10.1112/plms/s3-65.1.121.
- Truss, J. K. (June 1995). "The structure of amorphous sets". Annals of Pure and Applied Logic. 73 (2): 191–233. doi:10.1016/0168-0072(94)00024-W. ISSN 0168-0072.
- Creed, P.; Truss, J. K. (3 February 2000). "On o-amorphous sets". Annals of Pure and Applied Logic. 101 (2): 185–226. doi:10.1016/S0168-0072(99)00017-2. ISSN 0168-0072.
- Creed, P.; Truss, J. K. (1 November 2001). "On quasi-amorphous sets". Archive for Mathematical Logic. 40 (8): 581–596. doi:10.1007/s001530100074. S2CID 16999253.
