= Elvira Mayordomo =

Spanish computer scientist

Elvira Mayordomo Cámara
- Citizenship: Spanish
- Education: University of Zaragoza, Universitat Politècnica de Catalunya
- Scientific career
- Fields: Computer Science
- Workplaces: University of Zaragoza
- Thesis: Contributions to the Study of Resource-Bounded Measure (1994)
- Doctoral advisor: José Balcazar

4th President of the Association Computability in Europe
- In office 2020–2024
- Preceded by: Paola Bonizzoni

Elvira Mayordomo Cámara is a Spanish computer scientist specialising in the theory of computation. She is professor at the University of Zaragoza and currently the President of the Association Computability in Europe.

== Career ==
Mayordomo studied mathematics and computer science at the University of Zaragoza, graduating in 1990. She obtained a doctorate at the Universitat Politècnica de Catalunya under the supervision of José Balcazar in 1994. After her Ph.D., she returned to the University of Zaragoza, first as instructor (1994–1996), then as Profesora Titular (1996–2007), and finally, from 2007, as Catedrática. Since 2004, she is also associate professor at Iowa State University.

Mayordomo is an editor of the journals ACM Transactions on Computation Theory, Computability, and Theory of Computing Systems. She is also one of the editors of the book series Theory and Applications of Computability. She has been on the Board (later Council) of the Association Computability in Europe since its foundation. She served as the chair of the CiE Publications Committee and became the fourth President of the Association in 2020. Mayordomo has also been on the Steering Committee of the conference series Computability, Complexity, and Randomness (CCR) since 2009 and on the Council of the European Association for Theoretical Computer Science since 2011.

Academic offices
Preceded by Paola Bonizzoni	President of the Association Computability in Europe; 2020–2024	Succeeded by incumbent
