= Arnold Oberschelp =

German mathematician and logician (1932–2024)

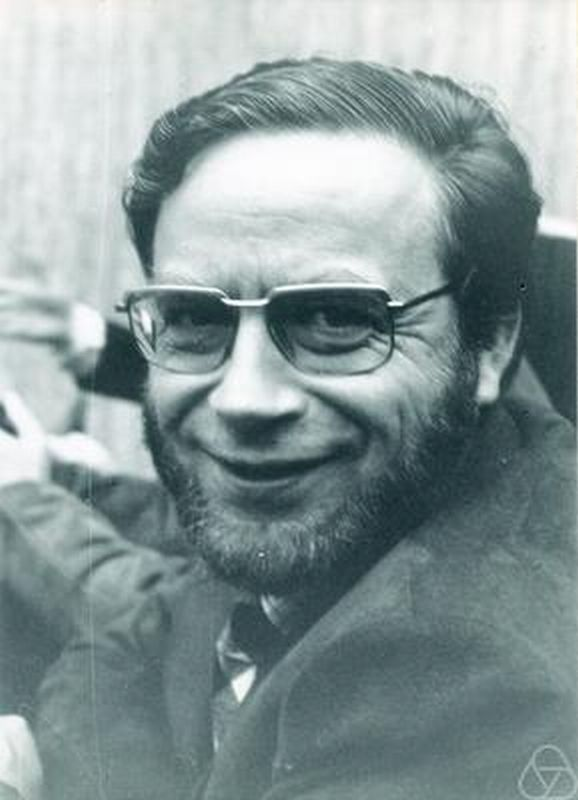
Oberschelp in 1978

Arnold Oberschelp (5 February 1932 – 31 August 2024) was a German mathematician and logician, born in Recklinghausen. He was a professor of logic and science at the University of Kiel.

== Life and career ==
Oberschelp studied mathematics and physics at the universities of Göttingen and Münster. In Münster he received in December 1957 his doctorate in mathematical logic under Hans Hermes. In 1958 he was a research assistant at the Mathematical Institute of the Technical College of Hannover (now Leibniz University Hannover) where he habilitated in mathematics in 1961. In 1968, he accepted an appointment as full professor of logic and science at the University of Kiel. Oberschelp has been emeritus professor since 1997.

Arnold Oberschelp developed a general class logic in which arbitrary classes can be formed without the contradictions of naive set theory. Additional axioms result in the Zermelo–Fraenkel set theory, which is much more handy in his class-logical representation than in the usual predicate logical representation.

In 1962 he gave a lecture as an invited speaker at the International Congress of Mathematicians in Stockholm on classes as "primal elements" in set theory.

From 1970 to 1976 he was chairman of the Deutsche Vereinigung für mathematische Logik und für Grundlagenforschung der exakten Wissenschaften, on whose board he served from 1965 to 1978.

In September 2019, he received the German Institute for Standardization's Beuth Memorial Coin in recognition of his services to standardization in mathematics and technical foundations.

Oberschelp died on 31 August 2024, at the age of 92.

== Selected works ==
- Arnold Oberschelp (1964). "Eigentliche Klassen als Urelemente in der Mengenlehre". Mathematische Annalen. 157 (3): 234–260. doi:10.1007/BF01362438. S2CID 122569882.
- Arnold Oberschelp (June 1968). "On the Craig-Lyndon Interpolation Theorem". The Journal of Symbolic Logic. 33 (2): 271–274. doi:10.2307/2269873. JSTOR 2269873. S2CID 30465874.
- Arnold Oberschelp (1972). Aufbau des Zahlensystems. Moderne Mathematik in elementarer Darstellung. Vol. 7 (2nd ed.). Göttingen: Vandenhoek+Ruprecht.
- Arnold Oberschelp (1973). Set Theory over Classes (Dissertationes Mathematicae (Rozprawy Matematyczne)). Instytut Matematyczny Polskiej Akademii Nauk.
- Elementare Logik und Mengenlehre I/II. Bibliographisches Institut, Mannheim/Wien/Zürich 1974/1978, ISBN 3-411-00408-8.
- Arnold Oberschelp (1980). "Prinzipien des Aufbaus von Syntax und Semantik formaler Sprachen". In Joachim Ballweg and Hans Glinz (ed.). Grammatik und Logik — Jahrbuch 1979 des Instituts für deutsche Sprache (PDF). Sprache der Gegenwart — Schriften des Instituts für deutsche Sprache. Vol. 50. Düsseldorf: Pädagogischer Verlag Schwann. pp. 9–27. ISBN 3-590-15650-3.
- Jürgen-Michael Glubrecht, Arnold Oberschelp, Günter Todt: Klassenlogik. Bibliographisches Institut, Mannheim/Wien/Zürich 1983, ISBN 3-411-01634-5.
- Arnold Oberschelp (1993). Rekursionstheorie. Mannheim: B.I. Wissenschaftsverlag. ISBN 978-3-411-16171-3. — Review: Petr Hájek (June 1996). "Review". The Journal of Symbolic Logic. 61 (2): 699–701. JSTOR 2275689.
- Allgemeine Mengenlehre. BI-Wiss.-Verlag, Mannheim/Leipzig/Wien/Zürich 1994, ISBN 3-411-17271-1.
- Logik für Philosophen. 2nd ed., Metzler, Stuttgart/Weimar 1997, ISBN 3-476-01545-9.
