= Paola Bonizzoni =

Italian computer scientist

- Citizenship: Italian
- Education: University of Milan
- Scientific career
- Fields: Computer science
- Workplaces: Università di Milano-Bicocca
- Thesis: (1993)
- Doctoral advisor: Andrzej Ehrenfeucht, Giancarlo Mauri, Grzegorz Rozenberg

3rd President of the Association Computability in Europe
- In office 2016–2020
- Preceded by: Dag Normann
- Succeeded by: Elvira Mayordomo

Paola Bonizzoni is an Italian computer scientist. She is a professor of computer science at the Università di Milano-Bicocca. Her research areas include computational complexity, graph algorithms, computational biology, and bioinformatics.

== Career ==
Bonizzoni studied computer science at the University of Milan where she graduated in 1988 and obtained a doctorate in 1993 under the supervision of Andrzej Ehrenfeucht, Giancarlo Mauri, and Grzegorz Rozenberg. She worked at the University of Milan while holding visiting positions at the University of Colorado Boulder, UC Davis, and McMaster University. Since 1998, she has been affiliated with the Università di Milano-Bicocca where she was promoted to professor in 2007. Since 2018, she has been a member of the Academic Senate of the University of Milano-Bicocca.

Bonizzoni is Managing Editor of the journal Computability and editor of the book series Theory and Application of Computability. From 2016 to 2020, she served as the third President of the Association Computability in Europe. As of 2020, she is a member of the Association Council.

Academic offices
Preceded by Dag Normann	President of the Association Computability in Europe; 2016-2020	Succeeded by Elvira Mayordomo
