= Johann Makowsky =

Johann A. Makowsky
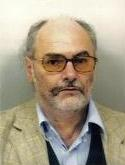
- Born: March 12, 1948 (age 78); Budapest, Hungary
- Education: Swiss Federal Institute of Technology
- Known for: Studies in model theory, database theory, logic programming, graph algorithms, graph polynomials
- Scientific career
- Fields: Mathematical logic, Computer science
- Workplaces: Technion-Israel Institute of Technology
- Doctoral advisor: Ernst Specker, Hans Läuchli

Johann (János) A. Makowsky (born March 12, 1948) is a Hungarian-born naturalised Swiss mathematician who works in mathematical logic and the logical foundations of computer science and combinatorics. He studied at ETH Zurich from 1967–73. He was a student in Zürich of Ernst Specker and Hans Läuchli in mathematical logic, (Diploma in Mathematics and Physics 1971, Dr. math.sc. in 1974), of Beno Eckmann (Topology and Geometry) and Volker Strassen (Algorithmics), and in Warsaw of Andrzej Mostowski and Witek Marek, where he spent 1972 as an exchange student. Makowsky held visiting positions at the Banach Center in Warsaw (Poland), Stanford University (USA), Simon Fraser University (Canada), University of Florence (Italy), MIT (USA), Lausanne University and ETH Zurich (Switzerland). He held regular positions at the Free University of Berlin and the Technion – Israel Institute of Technology (Haifa, Israel) where he was a full professor.

Among his various contributions are:

- In model theory, the solution of two open problems in categoricity theory and his study of logics with various interpolation and compactness properties (partially with Saharon Shelah and Jonathan Stavi).
- In database theory, the first undecidability result of the consequence problem for database dependencies (with Ashok Chandra and Harry Lewis), his work unifying the entity–relationship model and the relational model of databases (with Victor Markowitz), and his work on Boyce–Codd normal form (with E.V. Ravve).
- In logic programming, his fundamental studies of Horn formulas and their complexity (partially with B. Mahr and A. Itai)
- In graph algorithms, his unifying approach to tree-width and clique-width via model theory, leading to a general theory of graph polynomials and their definability in various logical formalisms (partially with I. Averbouch, Bruno Courcelle, B. Godlin, T. Kotek, U. Rotics and Boris Zilber).

Makowsky was a founding member of the European Association of Computer Science Logic in 1992, its vice-president (2002–2004) and president (2004–2009), and was a member of EACSL's executive council till 2014. During his presidency he established the EACSL Ackermann Award for outstanding PhD theses in computer science logic. In 2008, an event dedicated to Makowsky on his 60th birthday was co-located with the annual meeting of the EACSL.

Since 2016, he is a Professor Emeritus at the Faculty of Computer Science at the Technion, and continues his research and teaching and supervising graduate students
