= Aline Bonami =

French mathematician

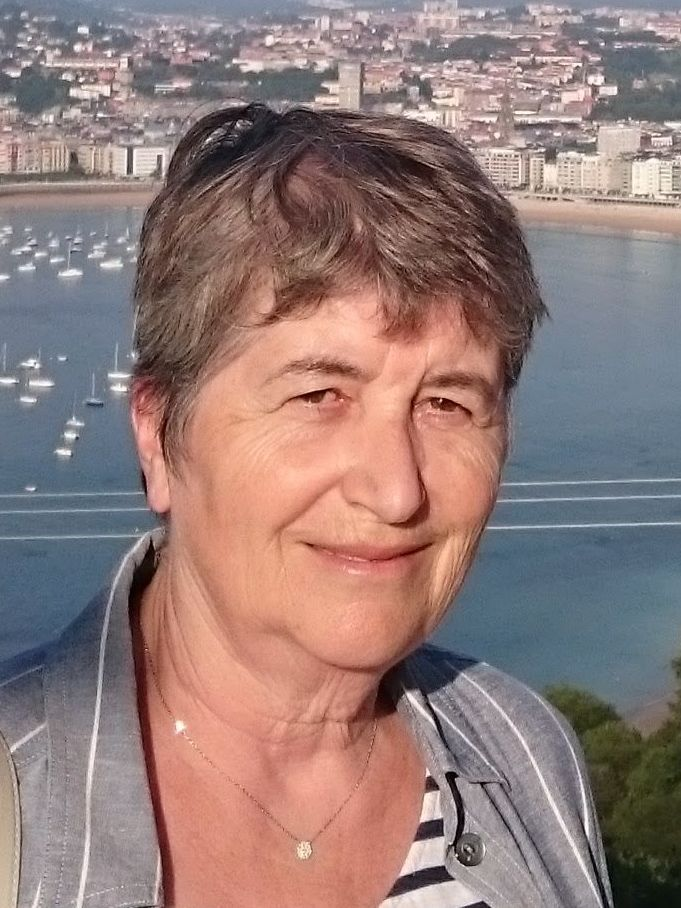
Aline Bonami in 2017

Aline Bonami (née Nivat) is a French mathematician known for her expertise in mathematical analysis. She is a professor emeritus at the University of Orléans, and was president of the Société mathématique de France for 2012–2013.

== Education and career ==
Bonami was a student at the École normale supérieure de jeunes filles from 1963 to 1967, when she became a researcher at the Centre national de la recherche scientifique (CNRS). In 1970, she completed a doctorate at the University of Paris-Sud, under the supervision of Yves Meyer; her dissertation was Etude des coefficients de Fourier des fonctions de $L^p(G)$. She joined the University of Orléans in 1973 and retired as a professor emeritus in 2006.

== Awards and honors ==
The French Academy of Sciences gave Bonami their Prix Petit d'Ormoy, Carrière, Thébault in 2001, for her results on Bergman and Szegő projections, on Hankel operators with several complex variables, and on inequalities for hypercontractivity. The University of Gothenburg gave her an honorary doctorate in 2002. A conference on harmonic analysis was held in her honor in Orléans in 2014. She was awarded the 2020 Stefan Bergman Prize by the American Mathematical Society "for her highly influential contributions to several complex variables and analytic spaces. She is being especially recognized for her fundamental work on the Bergman and Szegő projections and their corresponding spaces of holomorphic functions."

== Personal ==
Bonami is the sister of Georges Nivat, a specialist of Russian literature and history, and of French computer scientist Maurice Nivat.
