= Dag Normann =

Norwegian mathematician

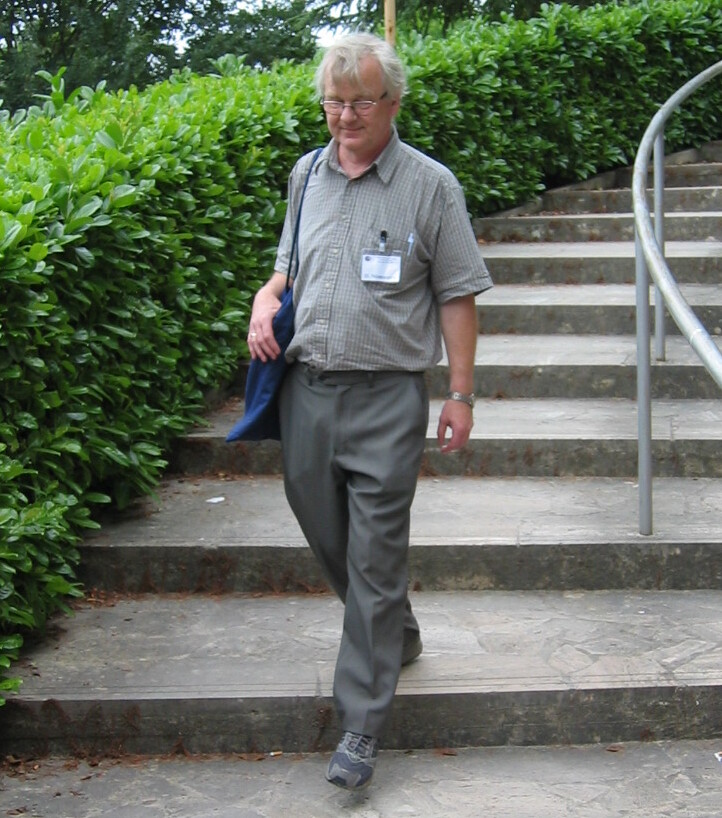
- Normann in 2007
- Born: 1947 (age 78–79)
- Education: University of Oslo
- Scientific career
- Fields: Mathematics, Logic
- Thesis: (1976)
- Doctoral advisor: Jens Erik Fenstad

2nd President of the Association Computability in Europe
- In office 2015–2016
- Preceded by: S. Barry Cooper
- Succeeded by: Paola Bonizzoni

Dag Normann is a Norwegian mathematical logician. He was born in 1947 and is Professor emeritus at the University of Oslo. His research focuses on computability theory with an emphasis on mathematical models for typed algorithms and applications of the foundations of mathematics.

== Career ==
Normann obtained his doctoral degree from the University of Oslo under the supervision of Jens Erik Fenstad in 1976. He was professor at the University of Oslo where he retired in 2015.

He published numerous books and research papers; in particular, together with John Longley, he published the book Higher-Order Computability, the standard research reference of the field, in the book series Theory and Applications of Computability in 2015. Normann is a member of the Norwegian Academy of Science and Letters (DNVA) in the Natural Sciences Division. In the past, he was the head of the Group of Mathematical Sciences within DNVA. From 1983 to 1985 and from 2000 to 2003, he was the President of the Norwegian Mathematical Society. He was President of the Association Computability in Europe from 2015 to 2016 and currently serves as Treasurer of the Association. He was also President of the Scandinavian Logic Society from 2012 to 2017.

Academic offices
Preceded by S. Barry Cooper	President of the Association Computability in Europe; 2015-2016	Succeeded by Paola Bonizzoni
