= Katrin Tent =

German mathematician

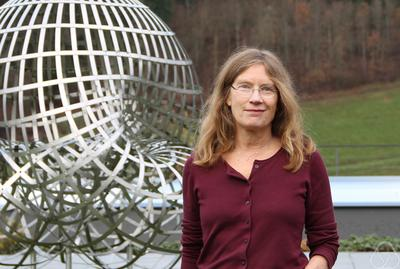
- Tent at Oberwolfach in 2023
- Born: 1963 (age 62–63)
- Education: University of Kiel, University of Notre Dame
- Scientific career
- Fields: Mathematics
- Workplaces: University of Münster
- Thesis: Classifying totally categorical groups (and others) (1994)
- Doctoral advisor: Stephen A. Buechler

Katrin Tent is a German mathematician specializing in group theory, the symmetries of groups, algebraic model theory, and Tits buildings. She is a professor of mathematics and mathematical logic at the University of Münster.

== Education and career ==
Tent studied mathematics, linguistics, and computer science at the University of Kiel from 1982 to 1988, obtaining a PhD in linguistics in 1988. After a year as a postdoctoral fellow at the Western University in Canada, she earned a diploma in mathematics in 1989 from the University of Kiel. She moved to the University of Notre Dame in the United States for doctoral study in mathematics, and completed her PhD there in 1994. Her dissertation, Classifying totally categorical groups (and others), was supervised by Steven A. Buechler.

After working as a visiting researcher at the Hebrew University of Jerusalem and then at the University of Würzburg, where she completed a habilitation in 2001 with the habilitation thesis Model theory of groups and BN-pairs, and after a brief stint as a lecturer at the University of Birmingham, she became a professor of mathematics at Bielefeld University in 2004. She took her present position as a professor of mathematics and mathematical logic at the University of Münster in 2008. She was an invited speaker at the ICM in 2026 in Philadelphia. Since 2020, she is President of the Deutsche Vereinigung für mathematische Logik und für Grundlagenforschung der exakten Wissenschaften.

== Books ==
With Martin Ziegler, Tent is the co-author of a book on model theory, A Course in Model Theory (Lecture Notes in Logic 40, Cambridge University Press, 2012). She is also the editor of Tits Buildings and the Model Theory of Groups (London Mathematical Society Lecture Note Series, Vol. 291, Cambridge University Press, 2002) and of Groups and Analysis: The Legacy of Hermann Weyl (London Mathematical Society Lecture Notes Series, Vol. 354, Cambridge University Press, 2008), and co-editor of Lectures in Model Theory (with Franziska Jahnke and Daniel Palacín, Münster Lectures in Mathematics, European Mathematical Society, 2018).
