= Helmut Schwichtenberg =

German mathematician and logician

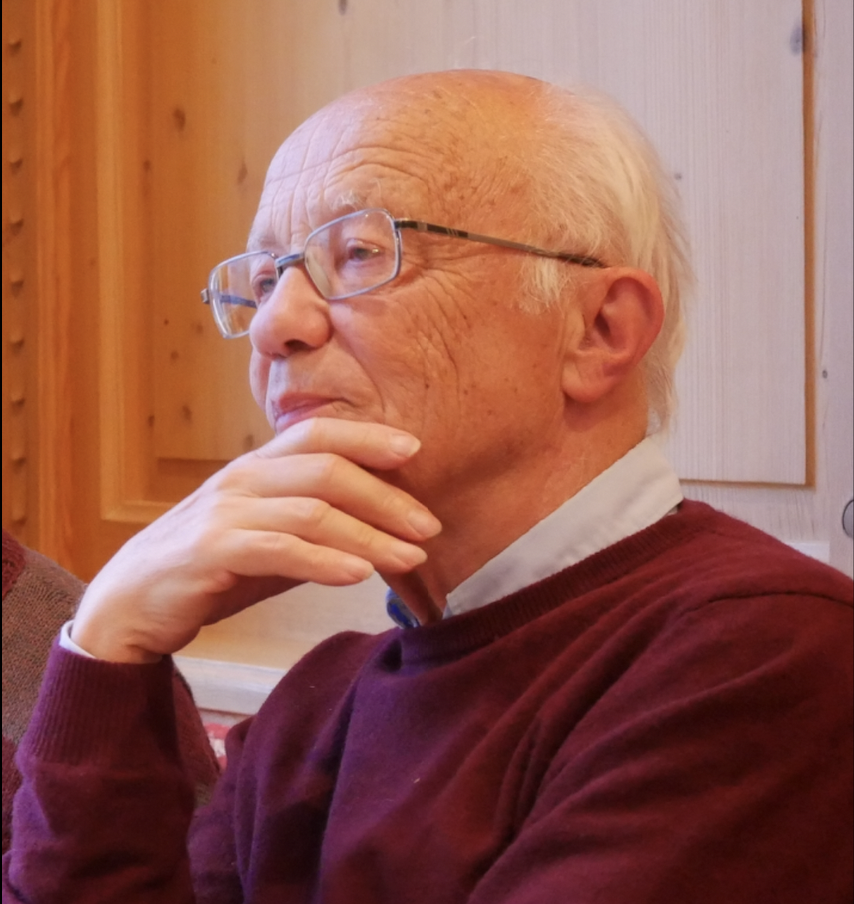
- Born: 5 April 1942 (age 84); Żagań, Poland
- Education: Free University of Berlin, University of Münster
- Scientific career
- Fields: Logic, Proof theory, Mathematics
- Workplaces: LMU Munich
- Thesis: A Classification of Multiple Recursive Functions
- Doctoral advisor: Dieter Rödding

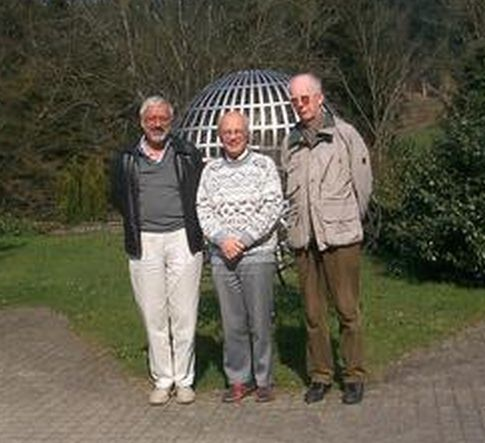
From left: Yiannis Moschovakis, Helmut Schwichtenberg, Anne Sjerp Troelstra, 2002 at the MFO

Helmut Schwichtenberg (born 5 April 1942) is a German mathematical logician.

Schwichtenberg studied mathematics from 1961 at the Free University of Berlin and from 1964 at the University of Münster, where he received his doctorate in 1968 from Dieter Rödding. He then worked as an assistant and then as a professor in Münster, and since 1978 has been professor of mathematical logic at LMU Munich (successor of Kurt Schütte).

Schwichtenberg deals with, among other things, proof theory, theory of computability, lambda calculus and applications of logic in computer science. He is a member of the Bavarian Academy of Sciences.

== Selected publications ==
- Helmut Schwichtenberg and Kurt Schütte (1990). "Mathematische Logik". In Gerd Fischer and Friedrich Hirzebruch and Winfried Scharlau and Willi Törnig (ed.). Ein Jahrhundert Mathematik, 1890–1990 – Festschrift zum Jubiläum der DMV. Dokumente zur Geschichte der Mathematik (in German). Vol. 6. Braunschweig: Vieweg. pp. 717–740. ISBN 3-528-06326-2.
- Troelstra, A. S.; Schwichtenberg, H. (2000) [1996]. Basic Proof Theory. Cambridge Tracts in Theoretical Computer Science. Vol. 43 (2nd ed.). Cambridge: Cambridge University Press. pp. XII, 417. doi:10.1017/CBO9781139168717. ISBN 9780521779111. OCLC 951181823.
- Helmut Schwichtenberg and Stanley S. Wainer (2012). Proofs and Computations. Cambridge: Cambridge University Press. ISBN 978-0-521-51769-0.
- Helmut Schwichtenberg (2006). "An arithmetic for polynomial-time computation". Theoretical Computer Science. 357 (1–3): 202–214. doi:10.1016/j.tcs.2006.03.019.
