= Heinrich Scholz =

German logician

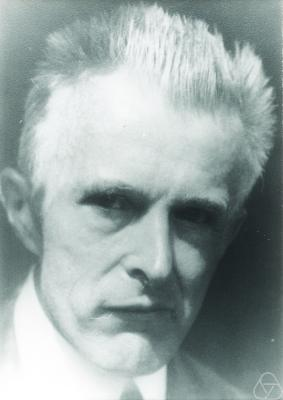
- Scholz at the Mathematical Research Institute Oberwolfach
- Born: 17 December 1884; Berlin, German Empire
- Died: 30 December 1956 (aged 72); Münster, West Germany
- Education: Münster University
- Known for: World's first seminar on computer science (with Alan Turing)
- Scientific career
- Fields: Mathematics; Logic
- Workplaces: University of Breslau; University of Berlin; Erlangen University
- Theses: Christentum und Wissenschaft in Schleiermachers Glaubenslehre (1909); Schleiermacher und Goethe; Ein Beitrag zur Geschichte des deutschen Geistes (1913)
- Doctoral advisor: Richard Falckenberg
- Other academic advisors: Adolf von Harnack; Friedrich Paulsen; Alois Riehl
- Doctoral students: Friedrich Bachmann; Gisbert Hasenjaeger; Hans Hermes; Karl Schröter
- Other notable students: Hermann Lübbe

Heinrich Scholz (German: [ʃɔlts]; 17 December 1884 – 30 December 1956) was a German logician, philosopher, and Protestant theologian. He was a peer of Alan Turing who mentioned Scholz when writing with regard to the reception of "On Computable Numbers, with an Application to the Entscheidungsproblem": "I have had two letters asking for reprints, one from Braithwaite at King's and one from a professor [sic] in Germany... They seemed very much interested in the paper. [...] I was disappointed by its reception here."

Scholz had an extraordinary career (he was considered an outstanding scientist of national importance) but was not considered a brilliant logician, for example on the same level as Gottlob Frege or Rudolf Carnap. He provided a suitable academic environment for his students to thrive. He founded the Institute of Mathematical Logic and Fundamental Research at the University of Münster in 1936, which can be said enabled the study of logic at the highest international level after World War II up until the present day.

== Personal life ==
Herman Scholz father was a Protestant minister at St. Mary's Church, Berlin. From 1903 to 1907 he studied philosophy and theology at Erlangen University and Berlin University achieving a Licentiate in theology (Lic. theol.). He was a student of Adolf von Harnack, in philosophy with peers Alois Riehl and Friedrich Paulsen. On 28 July 1910, Scholz habilitated in the subjects of religious philosophy and systematic theology in Berlin, and was promoted to full professor, therein working as a lecturer. In 1913, at Erlangen, Heinrich Scholz took his examination for promotion of Dr. phil. with Richard Falckenberg, studying the work of Schleiermacher and Goethe with a thesis titled: Schleiermacher und Goethe. Ein Beitrag zur Geschichte des deutschen Geistes. In 1917 he was appointed to the chair of Philosophy of Religion at the Breslau university succeeding Rudolf Otto to teach religious philosophy and systematic theology. In the same year he married his fiancée, Elisabeth Orth. Due to 8 years of continuous gastric trouble, he was exempted from military service. In 1919, he underwent an operation in which he believed to be a large part of his stomach was removed. That year he took the call to Kiel University, as the chair of philosophy. It was while at Kiel, in 1924, that Scholz's first wife, Elisabeth Orth died.

From October 1928 onwards, he taught in Münster University, first as Professor of Philosophy. In 1938, this was changed to Professor of Philosophy of Mathematics and Science and again in 1943 to Chair of Mathematical Logic and Fundamental Questions in Mathematics working as head of the Institute for Mathematical Logic and Fundamental Research at Münster until he retired in 1952 as professor emeritus.

Scholz was survived by his second wife, Erna. Scholz grave is located on the Park Cemetery Eichhof near Kiel.

== Career ==
From his own account, in 1921, having by accident came across Principia Mathematica by Bertrand Russell and Alfred North Whitehead he began studying logic, which he had abandoned in his youth to study theology, leading later to a study of mathematics and theoretical physics by taking an undergraduate degree at Kiel. However another factor in his change of focus was the mathematician Otto Toeplitz. Toeplitz's broad research interests including Hilbert spaces and spectral theory encouraged Scholz interest in mathematics. Indeed, Segal suggests that Scholz love of structure was also an important factor in his move into mathematical logic, describing it this:

Scholz's feeling for structure was no small thing. He apparently felt that when having guests for dinner: (1) no more than six people should be invited; (2) there must be an excellent menu; (3) a discussion theme must be planned; and (4) the guests should have prepared themselves as much as possible beforehand on this theme.

In 1925, he was a peer of Karl Barth at Münster University, in which he taught Protestant theology. Under the influence of conversations with Scholz, Barth later wrote in 1930/31. his book about the Anselm of Canterbury proof of God "fides quaerens intellectum."

In the 1930s, he maintained contact with Alan Turing who later – in a letter home dated 22 February 1937 – wrote with regard to the reception of his article "On Computable Numbers, with an Application to the Entscheidungsproblem":

I have had two letters asking for reprints, one from Braithwaite at King's and one from a proffessor [sic] in Germany... They seemed very much interested in the paper. I think possibly it is making a certain amount of impression. I was disappointed by its reception here. I expected Weyl who had done some work connected quite closely with it some years ago at least to have made a few remarks about it.

At the University of Münster, his study into mathematical logic and basic research, provided many of the critical insights, that contributed to the foundations of theoretical computer science. Right from the time he arrived at Münster, Scholz worked towards building a school of mathematical logic. By 1935, his research team at Münster were being referred to as the Münster school of mathematical logic. Scholz names 1936, as the year the Münster School was born. His professorship was rededicated in 1936 to a lectureship for mathematical logic and fundamental research and in 1943 the first chair in Germany for mathematical logic and fundamental research. The Münster Chair is still regarded as one of the best in Germany.

Scholz was considered a Platonist, and in that sense, he regarded the mathematical logic as the foundation of knowledge. In 1936 he was awarded a grant from the DFG, for the production of three volumes of research in logic and for the editing of the Gottlob Frege papers. He is considered the discoverer of the estate of Gottlob Frege.

Gisbert Hasenjaeger whose thesis had been supervised by Scholtz, produced a book Grundzüge der mathematischen Logik in 1961 which was jointly authored with Scholz despite being published five years after Scholz's death.

=== Work during World War II ===
Initially Scholz was pleased with the rise of Nazi power in Germany. Describing himself a conservative nationalist, describing himself as such "We felt like Prussians right to the bone,"" and described by his friend Heinrich Behnke as a "small-minded Prussian nationalist". Behnke found discussing political issues difficult. In the beginning the Nazi laws helped establish Münster as an important centre for Logic as other university staff at Göttingen and Berlin Universities were being obliterated.

On 14 March 1940, Scholz sent a letter to the Education department of occupied Poland, seeking the release of Jan Salamucha, who had been professor of theology at Kraków University. Salamucha was sent to Sachsenhausen concentration camp in 1940. In October 1940, Scholz received a reply for the education minister which stated he had "injured the national honour" and was forbidden to send further petitions. Salamucha was later released but killed by the Nazis in 1944 However, Scholz persisted, first helping Alfred Tarski, who had fled Poland to the United States, to correspond with his wife who remained in Poland and later helping the Polish Logician Jan Łukasiewicz, who he had been corresponding since 1928, to leave Poland with his wife and hide in Germany.

Although Scholz recognized the true nature of the Nazis and abhorred them from mid-1942 onwards, he remained on good terms with Nazi academics like Ludwig Bieberbach. During the period of National Socialism, Max Steck, who championed the German Mathematics which rejected the formalist approach to mathematics, deeply opposed Hilbert's approach which he described as Jewish – the worst possible insult in Germany at this time. Max Steck acknowledged the "per se outstanding achievement of formalism" ("an sich betrachtet einmaligen Leistung des Formalismus"), but criticized the "missing epistemological component" ("Jede eigentliche Erkenntnistheorie fehlt im Formalismus") and on the only page of his main work where he connects formalism and Jews he mentions that "Jews were the actual trendsetters of formalism" ("die eigentlichen Schrittmacher des Formalismus"). In response to this, Bieberbach asked Scholz to write an article for Deutsche Mathematik, to answer the attacks on mathematical formalism by Steck, which was surprising since Bieberbach led the Nazi mathematicians' attack on Jewish mathematics. Ensuring that Hilbert was not considered "Jewish", Scholz wrote "What does formalised study of the foundations of mathematics aim at?." Scholz had received funding from Bieberbach as early as 1937, which prompted an annoyed Steck to write in his 1942 book:

What Scholz has understood is doubtless this, to obtain from the German State huge amounts of publication money for this logic production. We fundamentally reject this logic which praises the English empiricists and sensory philosophers such as the Englishmen Locke, Berkeley, Hume, and by now find it really time to speak for once about the "Great Germans".

There were three other articles by Heinrich Scholz in the journal German Mathematics: Ein neuer Vollständigkeitsbeweis für das reduzierte Fregesche Axiomensystem des Aussagenkalküls (1936), a review of the Nazi philosopher Wolfgang Cramer's book Das Problem der reinen Anschauung (33 The problem of pure perception)l (1938) and a review of Andreas Speiser's Ein Parmenideskommentar (1938).

== World's first computer science seminar ==
In the late 2000s, Achim Clausing was tasked with going through the remaining estate of Scholz at Münster University, and while going through the archive papers in the basement of the Institute of Computer Science, Clausing discovered two original prints of the most important publication of Alan Turing, which had been missing since 1945. In this case, the work "On Computable Numbers, with an Application to the Entscheidungsproblem" from 1936, which Scholz had requested, and a postcard from Turing. Based on the work by Turing and conversations with Scholz, Clausing stated "[it was] the world's first seminar on computer science." The second work, which was a Mind (journal) article, dates from 1950 and is a treatise on the development of artificial intelligence, Turing provided them with a handwritten comment. This is probably my last copy. At Sotheby's recently, comparable prints of Turing, with no attached dedication, sold for 180,000 euros.

== Bibliography ==
- Christianity and Science in Schleiermacher's Doctrine of the Faith, 1909
- Belief and unbelief in world history. One Response to Augustine de Civitate Dei, 1911
- Schleiermacher und Goethe. Ein Beitrag zur Geschichte des deutschen Geistes [Schleiermacher and Goethe. A Contribution to the History of the German Spirit] (Dissertation) (in German), Leipzig: J. C. Hinrichs, 1913
- Idealism as a carrier of the war thought. Friedrich Andreas Perthes, Gotha, 1915. Perthes' writings on World War II, Volume 3
- Politics and morality. An investigation of the moral character of modern realpolitik. Friedrich Andreas Perthes, Gotha, 1915. Perthes' writings on the World War, Volume 6
- The war and Christianity. Friedrich Andreas Perthes, Gotha, 1915. Perthes' writings on World War II, Volume 7
- The essence of the German spirit. Grote'sche Verlagsbuchhandlung, Berlin, 1917.
- The idea of immortality as a philosophical problem, 1920
- Philosophy of religion. Reuther & Reichard, Berlin, 1921, 2nd revised edition, 1922.
- On The 'Decline' of the West. A dispute with Oswald Spengler . Reuther & Reichard, Berlin; 2nd revised and supplemented edition, 1921.
- The religious philosophy of the as-if. A review of Kant and the idealistic positivism, 1921
- The importance of Hegel's philosophy for philosophers of the present day. Reuther & Reichard, 1921 Berlin
- The legacy of Kant's doctrine of space and time, 1924
- The Basics of Greek Mathematics, 1928 with Helmut Hasse
- Eros and Caritas. The platonic love and the love within the meaning of Christianity, 1929
- History of logic. Junker and Dünnhaupt, Berlin 1931 (1959 under outline of the history of logic Alber, Freiburg im Breisgau)
- Goethe's attitude to the question of immortality, 1934
- The new logistic logic and science teaching. In: Research and progress, Volume 11, 1935.
- The classical and modern logic. In: Sheets for German Philosophy, Volume 10, 1937, pp. 254–281.
- Fragments of a Platonist. Staufen, Cologne undated (1940).
- Metaphysics as a rigorous science. Staufen, Cologne 1941.
- A new form of basic research. Research and progress No. 35/36 born 1941, pp. 382ff.
- Logic, grammar, metaphysics. In: Archives of philosophy, Volume 1, 1947, pp. 39–80.
- Encounter with Nietzsche. Furrow, Tübingen 1948.
- Principles of mathematical logic. Berlin, Göttingen 1961 Gisbert Hasenjaeger
- Mathesis universalis. Essays on the philosophy as rigorous science, Edited by Hans Hermes, Friedrich Kambartel and Joachim Ritter, University Press, Darmstadt 1961.
- Scholz Leibniz and the mathematical basis for research, annual report German mathematician club 1943

=== Papers ===
- Fichte und Napoleon. In: Preußische Jahrbücher (in German), Volume 152, 1913, pp. 1–12.
- The religious philosophy of the as-if. In: Annals of Philosophy, 1 Vol 1919, pp. 27–113
- The religious philosophy of the as-if. In: Annals of Philosophy, 3 Bd, H. 1 1923, pp. 1–73
- Why the Greeks did not build the irrational numbers?. In: Kant Studies Vol.3, 1928, pp. 35–72
- Augustine and Descartes. In: Sheets for German Philosophy, Volume 5, 1932, Issue 4, pp. 405–423.
- The idea of God in mathematics. In: Sheets for German Philosophy, Volume 8, 1934/35, pp. 318–338.
- Logic, grammar, metaphysics. In: Archives for Law and Social Philosophy, Volume 36, 1943/44, pp. 393–433

== Sources ==
- Hermes, Hans (1955), "Heinrich Scholz zum 70. Geburtstag" [Heinrich Scholz on the occasion of his 70th birthday], Mathematisch-Physikalische Semesterberichte (in German), 4: 165–170, ISSN 0340-4897
- Linneweber-Lammerskitten, Helmut (1995). "Scholz, Heinrich". Biographisch-Bibliographisches Kirchenlexikon (BBKL) (in German). Vol. 9: "Scharling, Carl Henrik – Sheldon, Charles Monroe". Herzberg: Traugott Bautz. cols. 683–687. ISBN 978-3-88309-058-0.
- Meschkowski, Herbert (1984), "Heinrich Scholz. Zum 100. Geburtstag des Grundlagenforschers" [Heinrich Scholz. On the occasion of the 100th Birthday of the fundamental researcher], Humanismus und Technik. Jahrbuch 1984 (in German), vol. 27, Berlin: Gesellschaft von Freunden der Technischen Universität Berlin e. V., pp. 28–52, ISSN 0439-884X
- Molendijk, Arie L. (1991), Aus dem Dunklen ins Helle. Wissenschaft und Theologie im Denken von Heinrich Scholz. Mit unveröffentlichten Thesenreihen von Heinrich Scholz und Karl Barth [Out of the Darkness to the Light. Science and Theology in the Thoughts of Heinrich Scholz. With unpublished sets of theses of Heinrich Scholz and Karl Barth], Amsterdam Studies in Theology (in German), vol. 8, Amsterdam / Atlanta GA: Editions Rodopi, ISBN 978-9051832471
- Peckhaus, Volker (1998–1999), "Moral integrity during a difficult period: Beth and Scholz", Philosophia Scientiae, 3 (4): 151–173
- Peckhaus, Volker (2018), "Heinrich Scholz", in Zalta, Edward N. (ed.), The Stanford Encyclopedia of Philosophy (Fall 2018 ed.), Stanford, CA: Metaphysics Research Lab, Stanford University
- Schmidt am Busch, Hans-Christoph; Wehmeier, Kai F., eds. (2005). Heinrich Scholz – Logiker, Philosoph, Theologe [Heinrich Scholz – Logician, philosopher, theologian] (in German and English). Paderborn, Germany: Mentis. ISBN 978-3897852792.
- Schmidt am Busch, Hans-Christoph (2007), "Scholz, Heinrich", Neue Deutsche Biographie (in German), vol. 23, pp. 454–455

== External works ==
- John J. O'Connor, Edmund F. Robertson : Heinrich Scholz (logician). In: MacTutor History of Mathematics archive (English)
- Publications by and on Heinrich Scholz in the catalog of the German National Library
- Stanford Encyclopedia of Philosophy
