= Maurice Nivat =

French computer scientist (1937–2017)

Professor Maurice Nivat Ph.D.
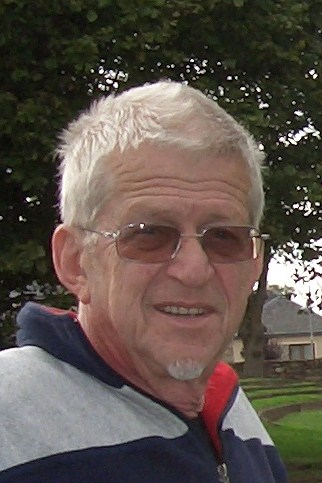
- Nivat in 2006
- Born: 21 December 1937; Clermont-Ferrand, France
- Died: 21 September 2017 (aged 79)
- Education: Joseph Fourier University
- Known for: Theoretical computer science
- Awards: French Academy of Sciences; Legion d'honneur; Ordre national du Mérite; Ordre des Palmes Académiques; EATCS; University of Bologna; University of Quebec at Montreal
- Scientific career
- Fields: Computer science
- Workplaces: University of Paris
- Thesis: Transductions of Chomsky Languages (1967)
- Doctoral advisor: Marcel-Paul Schützenberger
- Doctoral students: Bruno Courcelle; Philippe Flajolet; Gérard Huet

Maurice Paul Nivat (21 December 1937 – 21 September 2017) was a French computer scientist. His research in computer science spanned the areas of formal languages, programming language semantics, and discrete geometry. A 2006 citation for an honorary doctorate (Ph.D.) called Nivat one of the fathers of theoretical computer science. He was a professor at the University Paris Diderot until 2001.

== Early life and education ==
Nivat was born in Clermont-Ferrand, France. His parents were high-school teachers; his father taught languages while his mother taught mathematics. His sister, Aline, became a notable mathematician. In 1954, Nivat moved with his family to Paris. Nivat was admitted to the École normale supérieure in 1956, but began working at the Blaise Pascal Institute of the French National Centre for Scientific Research, a newly established computing laboratory, in 1959. He returned to study mathematics in 1961 under the supervision of Marcel-Paul Schützenberger. His 1967 thesis was entitled Transductions des langages de Chomsky ("Transductions of Chomsky Languages").

== Career ==
In 1969, Nivat became a professor at Paris Diderot University and taught until 2002. He remained as professor emeritus until his death in 2017.

He was involved in many endeavours in theoretical computer science in Europe: he was one of the founders of the European Association for Theoretical Computer Science (EATCS) in 1972 and organized the first International Colloquium on Automata, Languages and Programming (ICALP) conference in the same year at French Institute for Research in Computer Science and Automation (INRIA, then called IRIA) in Paris. In 1975, he was a founder of the journal Theoretical Computer Science. He was editor-in-chief of the journal for over 25 years.

He was a member of the International Federation for Information Processing (IFIP) IFIP Working Group 2.1 on Algorithmic Languages and Calculi, which specified, supports, and maintains the programming languages ALGOL 60 and ALGOL 68.

== Awards ==
Since 1983, Nivat was a corresponding member of the French Academy of Sciences. Nivat was also an officer of both the Legion d'honneur and the Ordre national du Mérite, and a commander of the Ordre des Palmes Académiques in France. Nivat won the EATCS award in 2002. He received honorary doctorates from the University of Bologna in 1997 and the University of Quebec at Montreal in 2006.
