= Wolfgang Cramer =

German philosopher and mathematician (1901–1974)

- Born: 18 October 1901; Hamburg, Germany
- Died: 2 April 1974 (aged 72); Frankfurt, Germany

Education
- Education: University of Breslau (PhD, 1931)
- Theses: Die Reziprozitätsformel für Gaußsche Summen in reell quadratischen Zahlkörpern (The Reciprocity law for Gaussian Sums in real quadratic number fields) (1931); Das Problem der reinen Anschauung. Eine erkenntnistheoretische Untersuchung der Prinzipien der Mathematik (The problem of pure intuition. An epistemological investigation of the principles of mathematics.) (1935)
- Doctoral advisor: Hans Rademacher

Philosophical work
- Era: 20th-century philosophy
- Region: Western philosophy
- School: Neo-Kantianism
- Institutions: University of Breslau (1894–1915); Frankfurt (1915–1932)
- Main interests: Epistemology, Philosophy of mind, Metaphysics, The Absolute

Wolfgang Cramer (18 October 1901 – 2 April 1974) was a German philosopher and mathematician.

== Biography ==
=== Early years ===
Cramer, the son of a governmental master builder, was born in Hamburg and spent his school time in Breslau (now Wrocław, Poland). After his Abitur in 1920 he studied three semesters of philosophy directed by Richard Hönigswald and Siegfried Marck at the University of Breslau. A friend from this time was Moritz Löwi. At the University of Heidelberg he studied another semester of philosophy directed by Karl Jaspers. Afterwards he worked as a bank officer. In the winter term 1924/25 he started to study again and studied mathematics and physics at the University of Breslau. He completed his doctoral thesis in Number theory with the title Die Reziprozitätsformel für Gaußsche Summen in reell quadratischen Zahlkörpern (The Reciprocity law for Gaussian Sums in real quadratic number fields) in 1931, directed by Hans Rademacher.

=== During the Nazi Government ===
Cramer became a member of the Nazi Party and of the National Socialist Teachers League already on 1 May 1932. After the dismissal of Rademacher in the process of the Gleichschaltung, Cramer became an assistant of Werner Schmeidler at the mathematical institute. However, already in April 1933, Cramer expressed that he was "appalled at the manifestations of barbarism", so that he wanted to leave the Party. Moritz Löwi, a Jewish teacher and friend of Cramer, persuaded him to stay, that he would be able to act as someone unsuspected. Thus Cramer was essentially involved in Löwi's emigration via Czechoslovakia to the United States. Cramer dedicated to him his book Grundlegung einer Theorie des Geistes (Groundwork for a theory of mind) in 1957.

Cramer's habilitation thesis Das Problem der reinen Anschauung. Eine erkenntnistheoretische Untersuchung der Prinzipien der Mathematik (The problem of pure intuition. An epistemological investigation of the principles of mathematics.) was completed in 1933, but the procedure was firstly suspended for unknown reasons. First of all Cramer had to attend a lecturer's camp and academy, until he was graduated in 1935. The reasons for this unusual long duration of the procedure cannot be reconstructed in detail, but it seems that Cramer did not appear to be an ideal member of the Party. After his habilitation, Cramer became a private lecturer (Privatdozent) for Philosophy of the exact sciences in Breslau.

The looming conflict escalated when August Faust came to Breslau in the winter term of 1936/37. Cramer did not yield to the pressure by Faust to cease the contact with Richard Hönigswald and his circle of students or to support the removal of his Catholic colleague Bernhard Rosenmöller. Faust finally took revenge in 1942 with a withering evaluation. Faust especially found fault with the fact that "Dr. Cramer does make so little use of his National Socialist ideology", which meant his "spineless behaviour towards the Jew Hönigswald" as well as his restriction to "hair-splitting peripheral questions". In fact, neither did Cramer appear politically in public during the Nazi Regime, nor did he contribute anything to a National Socialist philosophy. Faust's evaluation prevented Cramer's appointment as adjunct professor and probably would have ended his career, had the Nazi Regime endured.

=== Post war ===
After the war, in 1949, Cramer became a private lecturer in Frankfurt. In 1953 he was appointed an adjunct professor and finally an extraordinary professor in 1962. Cramer died in 1974 in Frankfurt.

Students of Cramer, who later became professors themselves, were, among others, the Hegel scholar Hans-Friedrich Fulda and Reiner Wiehl, an expert on Whitehead. Due to Cramer's low academic position they usually did not write their theses under his supervision, but rather under that of Hans-Georg Gadamer in Heidelberg.

Wolfgang Cramer is the father of the philosopher Konrad Cramer (1933–2013).

== Philosophy ==
The first major influence on Cramer was the Neo-Kantianism of Richard Hönigswald. Thus his systematic starting point was always the critical engagement with Transcendental idealism and Kant, together with some inspiration from the Monadology of Leibniz. From there he tried to develop a "transcendental ontology". His key thought was here, that transcendental philosophy as an analysis of subjectivity cannot fulfill its task, if it does not investigate the subject in its Being, especially its temporality. The "subject [...] is an entity in the sense, as the pre-kantian Metaphysics understood entities or existence." That way the Kantian restriction of knowledge to the field of appearances is transcendent.

In this spirit Hans Wagner characterises Cramer:

Cramer is not obliged to any pre-critical philosophy, neither does he ignore Kant's Critique of the transcendentally used reason, nor does he even fall back behind the critical questioning – yet still he attempts a doctrine of the Transcendent.

— H. Wagner, Ist Metaphysik des Transzendenten möglich?, op.cit., p. 290f.

However, one should be aware that, although Cramer started to work on the topic of old metaphysics, he did not present a full-sized, complete ontology like the systems before Kant. Rather he constantly searched for minimal determinations, that means necessary conditions for finite subjectivity. The search for such conditions led him finally to Speculative philosophy, to the question of the Absolute. For the mind, thinking, has essentially to do with universal determinations, according to Cramer. Theory of mind makes the question for universals unavoidable. Thus his philosophy of the subject leads him consistently into ontology, theory of categories and finally to the Absolute.

His engagement with the question of the Absolute particularly involves a critical examination of Spinoza, Kant's rejection of the proofs for the existence of God and philosophers of German Idealism. It was Cramer's goal to show how the Absolute can be thought as determining everything, but leaving at the same time freedom for contingent otherness. In particular this should happen without any reference to contingent being, because otherwise the Absolute would stand under the conditions of the contingent. This challenge is especially central in his last project, the so-called "absolute reflection".

== Works ==
Monographies

- Das Problem der reinen Anschauung. Mohr, Tübingen 1937.
- Die Monade. Das philosophische Problem vom Ursprung. Kohlhammer Verlag, Stuttgart 1954.
- Grundlegung einer Theorie des Geistes. Klostermann, Frankfurt am Main 1957. (4. ed. 1999. (Philosophische Abhandlungen; 14), ISBN 3-465-03002-8)
- Das Absolute und das Kontingente. Klostermann, Frankfurt am Main 1959. (2. ed. 1976. (Philosophische Abhandlungen; 17))
- Spinozas Philosophie des Absoluten. Klostermann, Frankfurt am Main 1966. (W. C.: Die absolute Reflexion; 1)
- Gottesbeweise und ihre Kritik. Prüfung ihrer Beweiskraft. Klostermann, Frankfurt am Main 1967. (W. C.: Die absolute Reflexion; 2) 2. ed. 2010. (Klostermann Rote Reihe; 33), ISBN 978-3-465-04097-2)
- Die absolute Reflexion. Schriften aus dem Nachlass. Ed. by Konrad Cramer. Klostermann, Frankfurt am Main 2012, ISBN 978-3-465-03753-8

Published Articles

- Über den Begriff des Unendlichen. In: Blätter für Deutsche Philosophie. Vol. 11, 1938, pp. 272–284.
- Die Aporien des Zeno und die Einheit des Raumes. In: Blätter für Deutsche Philosophie. Vol. 12, 1939, pp. 347–364.
- Philosophie und ihre Geschichte. In: Blätter für Deutsche Philosophie. Vol. 14, 1941, pp. 343–355.
- Das Grundproblem der Philosophie. In: Diskus. Frankfurter Studentenzeitung. Vol. 4, 1954, Issue 2, Supplement, pp. 57–60.
- Hans Wagner: Philosophie und Reflexion. München/Basel 1959. Ernst Reinhard Verlag. In: Philosophische Rundschau Vol. 11, 1963, pp. 68–90.
- Raum, Zeit und transzendentaler Schein. In: Zeitschrift für philosophische Forschung. Vol. 13, 1959, pp. 568–582.
- Vom transzendentalen zum absoluten Idealismus. In: Kant-Studien. Vol. 52, 1960/61, pp. 3–32.
- Aufgaben und Methoden einer Kategorienlehre. In: Kant-Studien. Vol. 52, 1960/61, pp. 351–368.
- Individuum und Kategorie. In: Einsichten. Gerhard Krüger zum 60. Geburtstag. Klostermann, Frankfurt am Main 1962, pp. 39–70.
- Über die Grundlagen von Gottlob Freges Begriff des Logischen. In: Hermeneutik und Dialektik Festschrift für Hans-Georg Gadamer. Vol. 2. Mohr, Tübingen 1970, pp. 55–76.
- Kausalität und Freiheit. In: Philosophische Perspektiven. Vol. 5, 1973, pp. 9–28.
- Das Absolute. In: Hermann Krings (Ed.): Handbuch philosophischer Grundbegriffe, München 1973.
- Das Ich und das Gute. Eine Grundlegung der Philosophie. In: Neue Hefte für Philosophie. Vol. 27/28, 1988, pp. 1–55.
