= Bruno Courcelle =

French mathematician and computer scientist

- Citizenship: French
- Education: French Institute for Research in Computer Science and Automation
- Known for: Courcelle's theorem
- Scientific career
- Fields: Graph theory, Computer science
- Workplaces: University of Bordeaux
- Thesis: Application de la théorie des langages à la théorie des schémas de programmes (1976)
- Doctoral advisor: Maurice Nivat

Bruno Courcelle is a French mathematician and computer scientist, best known for Courcelle's theorem in graph theory.

== Life ==
Courcelle earned his Ph.D. in 1976 from the French Institute for Research in Computer Science and Automation, then called IRIA, under the supervision of Maurice Nivat. He then joined the Laboratoire Bordelais de Recherche en Informatique (LaBRI) at the University of Bordeaux 1, where he remained for the rest of his career. He has been a senior member of the Institut Universitaire de France since 2007.

A workshop in honor of Courcelle's retirement was held in Bordeaux in 2012. Courcelle was the first recipient of the S. Barry Cooper Prize of the Association Computability in Europe in 2020. In 2022, Courcelle was awarded the EATCS-IPEC Nerode Prize.

During the COVID-19 pandemic, Courcelle protested against vaccination mandates in France.

== Work ==
He is known for Courcelle's theorem, which combines second-order logic, the theory of formal languages, and tree decompositions of graphs to show that a wide class of algorithmic problems in graph theory have efficient solutions.

Notable publications also include:

- Bruno Courcelle (1983). "Fundamental Properties of Infinite Trees". Theoretical Computer Science. 25 (2): 95–169. doi:10.1016/0304-3975(83)90059-2.
- Bruno Courcelle (1990). "Recursive Applicative Program Schemes". In Jan van Leeuwen (ed.). Formal Models and Semantics. Handbook of Theoretical Computer Science. Vol. B. Elsevier. pp. 459–492. ISBN 0-444-88074-7.
- Courcelle, Bruno (1999). "Hierarchical Graph Decompositions Defined by Grammars and Logical Formulas". Rewriting Techniques and Applications. Lecture Notes in Computer Science. Vol. 1631. Springer. pp. 90–91. doi:10.1007/3-540-48685-2_7. ISBN 978-3-540-66201-3.
