= Anne Sjerp Troelstra =

Dutch mathematician (1939–2019)

- Born: 10 August 1939; Maartensdijk, Utrecht
- Died: 7 March 2019 (aged 79); Blaricum
- Education: University of Amsterdam
- Scientific career
- Fields: Mathematics
- Workplaces: University of Amsterdam
- Thesis: Intuitionistic General Topology (1966)
- Doctoral advisor: Arend Heyting
- Doctoral students: Rosalie Iemhoff; Ieke Moerdijk

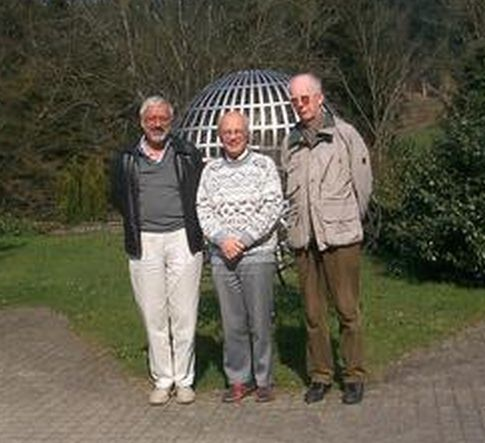
Troelstra (right) with Helmut Schwichtenberg and Yiannis Moschovakis (left), 2002.

Anne Sjerp Troelstra (10 August 1939 – 7 March 2019) was a professor of pure mathematics and foundations of mathematics at the Institute for Logic, Language and Computation (ILLC) of the University of Amsterdam.

He was a constructivist logician, who was influential in the development of intuitionistic logic With Georg Kreisel, he was a developer of the theory of choice sequences. He wrote one of the first texts on linear logic, and, with Helmut Schwichtenberg, he co-wrote an important book on proof theory.

He became a member of the Royal Netherlands Academy of Arts and Sciences in 1976. Troelstra died on 7 March 2019.

After his retirement in 2000, Troelstra began a prolific career as the author of books on natural history travel, including the Bibliography of Natural History Travel Narratives, published with Brill in 2017. There are many others in Dutch, including Tijgers op de Ararat. Natuurhistorische reisverhalen 1700-1950 (Tigers on the Ararat. Natural History Travel Narratives 1700-1950), Van Spitsbergen naar Suriname (From Spitsbergen to Surinam).
