= Bad Laer =

- Municipality
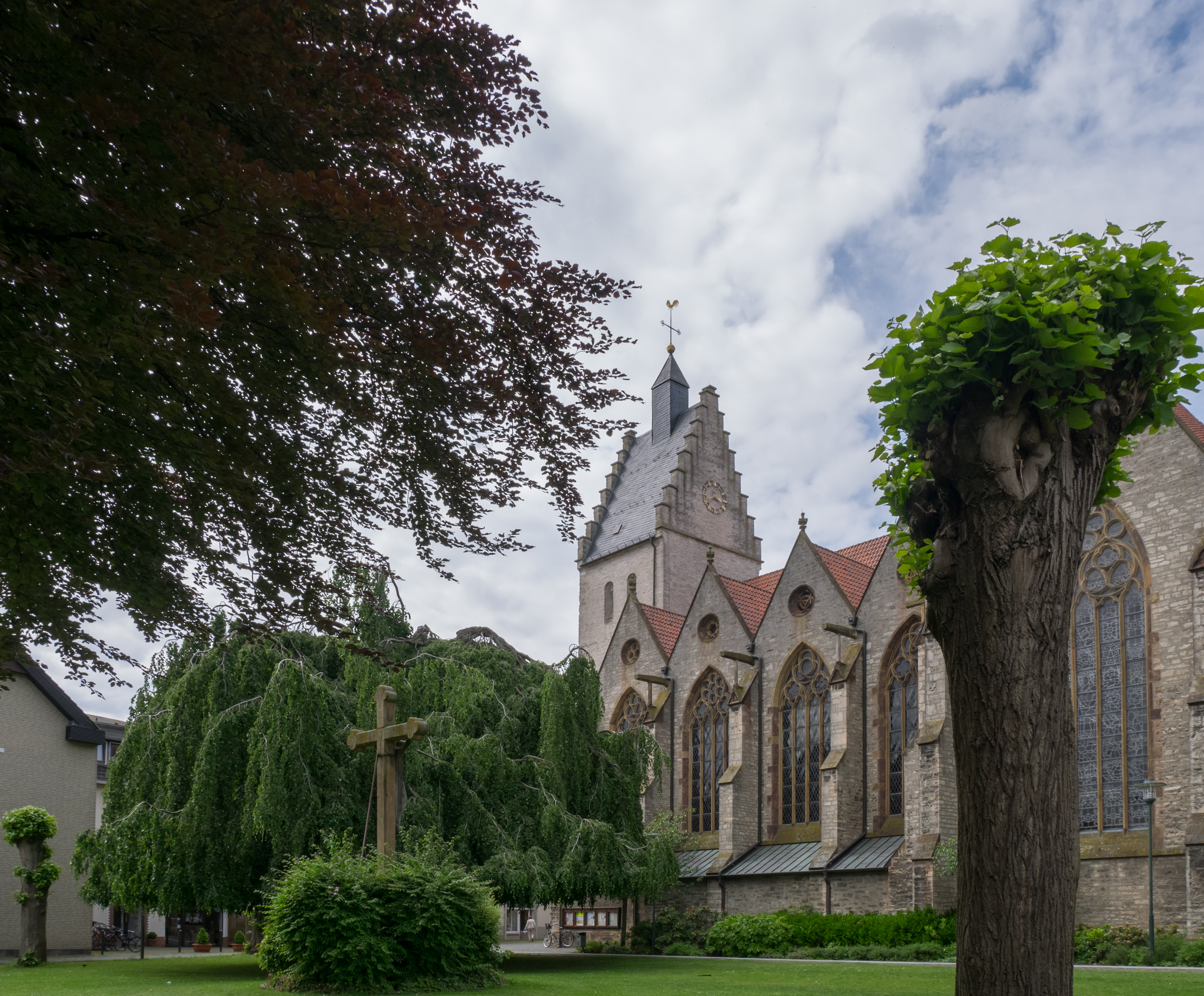
- Saint Mary's Church

- Coat of arms

- Location of Bad Laer within Osnabrück district
- Interactive map of Bad Laer
- Location within Germany Location within Lower Saxony
- Coordinates: 52°06′11″N 08°05′21″E
- Country: Germany
- State: Lower Saxony
- District: Osnabrück

Government
  - Mayor (2018–23): Tobias Avermann

Area
  - Total: 46.81 km^{2} (18.07 sq mi)
- Elevation: 79 m (259 ft)

Population (2025-12-31)
  - Total: 8,828
  - Density: 188.6/km^{2} (488.5/sq mi)
- Time zone: UTC+01:00 (CET)
  - Summer (DST): UTC+02:00 (CEST)
- Postal codes: 49196
- Dialling codes: 05424
- Vehicle registration: OS, BSB, MEL, WTL
- Website: www.bad-laer.de

Bad Laer (German pronunciation: [baːt ˈlaːɐ̯]) is a municipality and health resort in the district of Osnabrück, in Lower Saxony, Germany. It is situated in the Teutoburg Forest, approx. 20 km south of Osnabrück.

The municipality includes Bad Laer and five outlying districts Remsede, Müschen, Hardensetten, Westerwiede and Winkelsetten.
