= Benedikt Löwe =

German mathematician and logician

Benedikt Löwe MAE
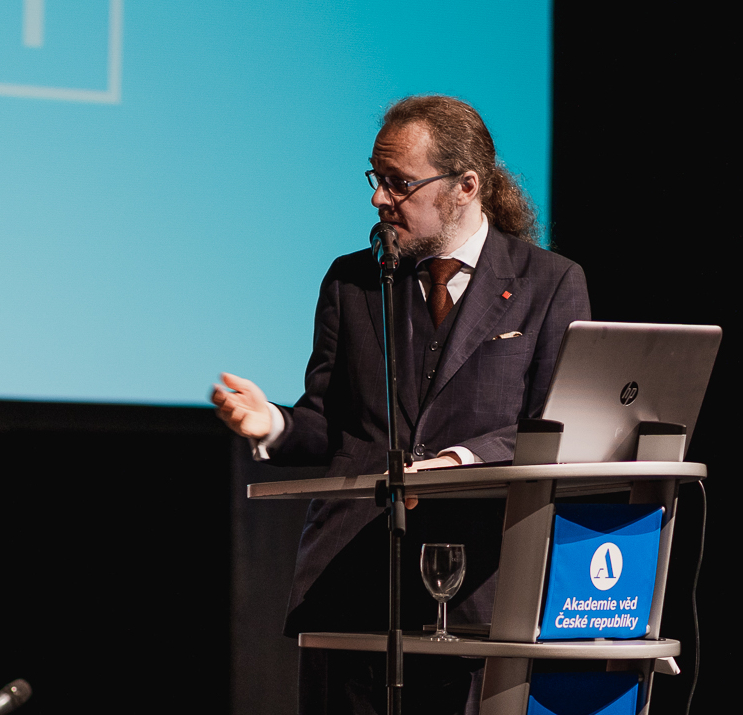
- Benedikt Löwe in Prague, August 2019
- Born: 1972 (age 53–54)
- Education: University of Tübingen, Humboldt University of Berlin
- Scientific career
- Fields: Mathematics, Logic
- Thesis: Blackwell Determinacy (2001)
- Doctoral advisors: Ronald Jensen; Donald Anthony Martin
- Doctoral students: Sara L. Uckelman

Benedikt Löwe MAE (born 1972) is a German mathematician and logician working at the universities of Hamburg and Cambridge. He is known for his work on mathematical logic and the foundations of mathematics, as well as for initiating the interdisciplinary conference series Foundations of the Formal Sciences (FotFS; 1999–2013) and Computability in Europe (CiE; since 2005).

== Biography ==
Löwe studied mathematics and philosophy at the universities of Hamburg, Tübingen, HU Berlin, and Berkeley. In 2001, he completed his PhD entitled Blackwell Determinacy about determinacy under supervision of Donald A. Martin and Ronald Björn Jensen. He worked at the Institute for Logic, Language and Computation of the University of Amsterdam from 2003 to 2023. In 2009, he was appointed professor for mathematical logic and interdisciplinary applications of logic at the University of Hamburg and is also an extraordinary fellow at Churchill College of the University of Cambridge. Löwe was Managing Editor of the journal Mathematical Logic Quarterly from 2011 to 2022.

He was the President of the German Association for Mathematical Logic and for Basic Research in the Exact Sciences (DVMLG) from 2012 to 2022 and the Secretary General of the Division for Logic, Methodology and Philosophy of Science and Technology of the International Union of History and Philosophy of Science and Technology from 2015 to 2023. Since 2023, he is one of the Vice Presidents of the International Council for Philosophy and Human Sciences (CIPSH).

He is a member of the International Academy for Philosophy of Science, the Academia Europaea (MAE), the Akademie der Wissenschaften in Hamburg, and a Fellow of the International Science Council (FISC).

== Co-edited Volumes (a selection) ==
- 2006. Logical approaches to computational barriers : Second Conference on Computability in Europe, CiE 2006, Swansea, UK, June 30 – July 5, 2006; proceedings. Co-edited with Arnold Beckmann, Ulrich Berger and John V. Tucker.
- 2008. Games, scales, and Suslin cardinals. Co-edited with Alexander S. Kechris and John R. Steel. Cambridge : Cambridge University
- 2008. Logic and theory of algorithms : 4th Conference on Computability in Europe, CiE 2008, Athens, Greece, June 15 – 20, 2008; proceedings. Co-edited with Arnold Beckmann and Costas Dimitracopoulos. Berlin; Heidelberg [u.a.] : Springer
- 2011. Wadge Degrees and Projective Ordinals The Cabal Seminar Volume II. Co-edited with Alexander S. Kechris and John R. Steel.
