= Victor M. Markowitz =

American computer scientist

Victor M. Markowitz is chief informatics officer and associate director at DOE Joint Genome Institute (JGI), and head of Lawrence Berkeley National Laboratory's Biological Data Management and Technology Center.

He received his M.Sc. and D.Sc. degrees in computer science from Technion - Israel Institute of Technology. Markowitz has authored articles and book chapters on various aspects of data management and served on review panels and program committees for database and bioinformatics programs and conferences.

== Biography ==
Markowitz served as chief information officer (CIO) and senior vice president, data management systems, at Gene Logic Inc., from 2000 to 2003. He was vice president and then senior vice president, data management systems, from 1997 to 2000, at Gene Logic. Markowitz built Gene Logic's data management, software development, applied bioinformatics, and Information technology (IT) organization, starting with an initial group of five scientists located in Berkeley, that has grown to a staff of over a hundred software engineers, computer scientists, bioinformatics scientists, and IT specialists, located in Berkeley and Gaithersburg, Maryland. He directed the development of Gene Logic's data management products, including its flagship Genesis data management platform for gene expression data. These products are used by over 25 pharmaceutical and biotech companies worldwide and constitute Gene Logic's main source of revenues. The tools and methodology used for developing Genesis have been presented at conferences and professional meetings, and have been described in several papers.

Prior to joining Gene Logic, Markowitz was at Lawrence Berkeley National Laboratory, where he led the development of the Object protocol model (OPM) data management and integration tools that have been used for developing public and commercial genome databases. The OPM tools have been successfully used for developing several public molecular biology databases, such as the genome database at the Johns Hopkins School of Medicine in Baltimore, and the German Genome Resource Center's Primary Database in Berlin, and for setting up prototype molecular biology multi-database systems. The OPM data management tools continue to be used by scientific database groups in United States and Europe, have been presented at seminars, database conferences, and professional meetings, and have been described in several scientific papers.

Prior to this Markowitz has conducted research connecting the Relational model with the Entity-relationship model. He is also the inventor of both ERROL - An Entity-Relationship Role-Oriented query Language, and the related Reshaped relational algebra (RRA), developed as his M.Sc. project. For this he won the 1984 Computer Science Award of ILA – The Israeli Information Technology Association, together with his M.Sc. adviser Dr. Yoav Raz and the ERROL-to-RRA compiler developer Reuven Cohen.

== See also ==
- Object protocol model (OPM)
- ERROL - An Entity-Relationship Role-Oriented query Language
- Reshaped relational algebra (RRA)
