= Mariya Soskova =

Bulgarian mathematician

Mariya Ivanova Soskova is a Bulgarian mathematician who works in the United States as a professor of mathematics at the University of Wisconsin–Madison. Her research concerns computability theory, and especially enumeration degrees, the equivalence classes of computational problems for enumeration reducibility.

== Education and career ==
Soskova received a bachelor's degree in computer science in 2004 and a master's degree in mathematics in 2005, both from Sofia University. She then traveled to the UK as a Marie Curie Research Fellow at the University of Leeds, where she completed her Ph.D. in 2008. Her doctoral dissertation, The Local Structure of the Enumeration Degrees, was supervised by S. Barry Cooper.

She returned to Sofia University as an associate professor in the Department of Mathematical Logic and its Applications and Faculty of Mathematics and Informatics, from 2008 to 2017. After becoming a visiting scholar at the University of California, Berkeley from 2012 to 2014, she returned to the US as a lecturer at the University of Wisconsin in 2016, and was appointed as an assistant professor in 2017. In the following year, she was promoted to associate professor, and in 2021, she was promoted again, to full professor.

== Recognition ==
Soskova was named as a Fellow of the American Mathematical Society, in its 2027 class of fellows.
