= Heinz-Dieter Ebbinghaus =

German mathematician and logician

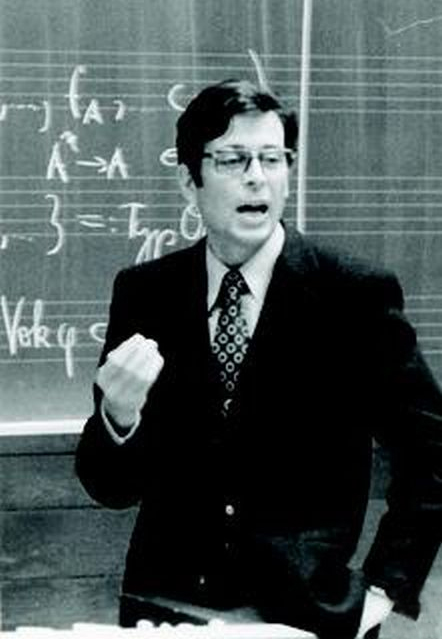
Ebbinghaus in Hanover, 1974

Heinz-Dieter Ebbinghaus (born 22 February 1939 in Hemer, Province of Westphalia) is a German mathematician and logician. He received his PhD in 1967 at the University of Münster under Hans Hermes and Dieter Rödding.

Ebbinghaus has written various books on logic, set theory and model theory, including a seminal work on Ernst Zermelo. His book Einführung in die mathematische Logik, joint work with Jörg Flum and Wolfgang Thomas, first appeared in 1978 and became a standard textbook of mathematical logic in the German-speaking area. It is currently in its sixth edition (ISBN 9783662580288). An English edition of Mathematical Logic was published in the Springer-Verlag Undergraduate Texts in Mathematics series in 1984 (ISBN 0387908951), with a second edition in 1994 (ISBN 0-387-94258-0) and a third edition in 2021 (ISBN 978-3030738389).

== Books ==
- Heinz-Dieter Ebbinghaus, Volker Peckhaus. Ernst Zermelo: An Approach to His Life and Work, 2007, ISBN 978-3-642-08050-0.
- Heinz-Dieter Ebbinghaus, Jörg Flum. Finite Model Theory, 2005, ISBN 3-540-28787-6.
- Heinz-Dieter Ebbinghaus, Jörg Flum, Wolfgang Thomas. Einführung in die mathematische Logik, six editions since 1978.
