= Johanna N. Y. Franklin =

American mathematician

- Education: University of California, Berkeley
- Known for: Algorithmic randomness
- Scientific career
- Fields: Mathematics, Computability Theory
- Workplaces: Hofstra University
- Thesis: Aspects of Schnorr Randomness (2007)
- Doctoral advisor: Theodore Slaman

Johanna N. Y. Franklin is an American mathematician and professor of mathematics working at Hofstra University. She is known for her work on algorithmic randomness.

== Biography ==
Franklin completed her BS and MS at Carnegie Mellon University, and her PhD, on Aspects of Schnorr Randomness under the supervision of Theodore Slaman at University of California, Berkeley, in 2007.

She has held postdoctoral research positions at the National University of Singapore, Fields Institute, University of Waterloo, Dartmouth College, and University of Connecticut, and has worked at Hofstra University since 2014, where she was promoted to professor in 2023.

Franklin is an editor of the Archive for Mathematical Logic and a reviews editor for the Bulletin of Symbolic Logic.

== Awards and recognition ==
In 2024, Franklin received the Association for Women in Mathematics Service Award, which recognizes "individuals who have demonstrated exceptional service to the AWM by promoting and supporting women in mathematics."

== Notable Publications ==
=== Books ===
- 2026. Effective Metric Structure Theory (co-authored with Isaac Goldbring, and Timothy H. McNicholl). Springer Cham, Springer Monographs in Mathematics.

=== Co-edited Volumes ===
- 2020. Algorithmic Randomness: Progress and Prospects (co-edited with Christopher P. Porter). Cambridge University Press, Lecture Notes in Logic, vol. 50.
- 2022. Revolutions and Revelations in Computability (co-edited with Ulrich Berger, Florin Manea, and Arno Pauly). Springer, Lecture Notes in Computer Science, vol. 13359.
