= Sara L. Uckelman =

Professor of logic

Sara Uckelman is the professor of logic at Durham University, co-director of the Durham Centre for Ancient and Medieval Philosophy, and deputy director of liberal arts. Her research in formal logic focuses on formal modelling and interactive logic, bringing together techniques from logic and computer science to explore and understand reasoning in historical contexts. She is the vice-president of the British Logic Colloquium, and the editor in chief at Dictionary of Medieval Names from European Sources.

She is also a short story writer, published in Manawaker Studio Flash Fiction Podcast, Pilcrow & Dagger, Story Seed Vault, and The Martian Wave. Uckelman is the founder of SFF Reviews, a website that provides short reviews of short science-fiction & fantasy stories, to which she also contributes reviews.

== Selected publications ==
- "The logic of categorematic and syncategorematic infinity", Synthese, 2015
- ""Sit Verum Obligationes" and Counterfactual Reasoning", Vivarium (journal), 53, 2015
- "What Problem Did Ladd-Franklin (Think She) Solve(d)?", Notre Dame Journal of Formal Logic 62(3): 527-552 (August 2021)
- "John Eliot's Logick Primer: A Bilingual English-Massachusett Logic Textbook", History and Philosophy of Logic 45 (3):278-301 (2023)
- "What Logical Consequence Could, Could Not, Should, and Should Not Be", Aristotelian Society Supplementary Volume 98 (1):255-275 (2024)
