= Kurt Gödel Society =

The Kurt Gödel Society (KGS) is a learned society which was founded in Vienna, Austria in 1987. It is an international organization aimed at promoting research primarily on logic, philosophy and the history of mathematics, with special attention to subjects that are connected with the Austrian logician and mathematician Kurt Gödel, in whose honour it was named.

The group also organizes an ongoing lecture series called Collegium Logicum. Former speakers include Henk Barendregt, George Boolos, Jaakko Hintikka and Wilfrid Hodges.

In April 2006, the Gödel society organized Horizons of Truth, an international symposium celebrating the 100th birthday of Kurt Gödel. The Gödel society, with support from the John Templeton Foundation, awards "Kurt Gödel Research Prize Fellowships". In 2008, a total amount of US$ 680,000 was awarded to the recipients David Fernández-Duque, Pavel Hrubeš, Andrey Bovykin, Peter Koellner, and Thierry Coquand. In 2011, a total amount of EUR 450,000, was awarded to the recipients Danko Ilik, Sean Walsh, Maryanthe Malliaris, Matteo Viale, and Ulrich Kohlenbach. In 2015, SIGLOG, EATCS, EACSL and the Kurt Gödel Society established the "Alonzo Church Award for Outstanding Contributions to Logic and Computation".
