= Hans Hermes =

German mathematician (1912–2003)

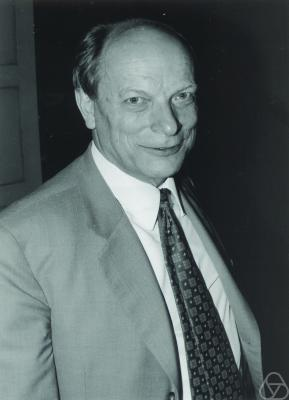
- Hermes at Oberwolfach, c. 1970
- Born: 12 February 1912; Neunkirchen, German Empire
- Died: 10 November 2003 (aged 91); Freiburg im Breisgau, Germany
- Education: University of Freiburg; Ludwig-Maximilians-Universität München; University of Münster (PhD); University of Bonn (habilitation)
- Known for: Research on mathematical logic and computability theory
- Spouse: Hedwig Breuer
- Children: 3
- Scientific career
- Fields: Mathematical logic, foundations of mathematics, computability theory
- Workplaces: University of Münster; University of Freiburg
- Theses: Eine Axiomatisierung der allgemeinen Mechanik (1938); Analytische Mannigfaltigkeiten in Riemannschen Bereichen (1947)
- Doctoral advisor: Adolf Kratzer, Heinrich Scholz
- Other academic advisors: Ernst Peschl
- Doctoral students: Heinz-Dieter Ebbinghaus, Heinz Gumin, Arnold Oberschelp, Walter Oberschelp

Hans Hermes (German: [ˈhɛʁmɛs]; 12 February 1912 – 10 November 2003) was a German mathematician and logician, who made significant contributions to the foundations of mathematical logic.

== Life ==
Hermes was born in Neunkirchen. From 1931, he studied mathematics, physics, chemistry, biology and philosophy at the University of Freiburg and the Ludwig-Maximilians-Universität München. In 1937, he passed the state examination at the University of Münster and was attending there in 1938 when the physicist Adolf Kratzer was present. After that, he went on a scholarship to the University of Göttingen and then became an assistant at the University of Bonn. During World War II, he was a soldier on the Channel Island of Jersey until 1943 and then on to the Chemical Physics Institute of the Navy in Kiel. At the end of the war, he moved to Toplitzsee, where he was tasked with working on new encryption methods. In 1947, he became a lecturer at the University of Bonn where he took his habilitation, his thesis called Analytical manifolds in Riemannian areas. In 1949, he became a Professor at the University of Münster, where he turned back to the subject of mathematical logic.

== Career ==
Hans Hermes was a pioneer of the Turing machine as the central concept of predictability. In 1937, Hermes reported under the title Definite terms and predictable numbers an article about the Turing machine, which still adheres closely to Turing ideas, but doesn't contain the concepts of the universal machine and the decision problem.

In 1952, he published together with Heinrich Scholz, an encyclopedia, which has significantly promoted the development of mathematical logic in Germany.

In 1953, he took over management of the Institute for Mathematical logic and basic research at the University of Münster, from Heinrich Scholz. Under his leadership, the Institute became a noted centre for attracting young researchers, both within the Federal Republic but also abroad. With Hermes there, among others, were Wilhelm Ackermann and Gisbert Hasenjaeger. In 1966, he accepted an appointment to the newly established Chair of Mathematical Logic and the Foundations of Mathematics at the University of Freiburg and began to build an eponymous department at the Mathematical Institute, becoming Professor Emeritus there in 1977.

In 1954, Hermes produced an informal proof, that the possibilities of programmable eigenvalues include the predictable functions, so the calculating machines have the same cardinality as Turing machines re:Turing completeness.

Hermes' textbooks, as well as his scientific work, persuaded Heinz-Dieter Ebbinghaus to note the originality, accuracy and intuitive clarity of his work.

Hermes was also worked on the compilation and publication of the papers of Gottlob Frege, already begun by Scholz. In 1962, he was one of the founding members of the German Association for mathematical logic and for basic research of the exact sciences (DVMLG). In 1950, he was with Arnold Schmidt and Jürgen von Kempski, co-founder of the Archive for Mathematical Logic and Foundations of Mathematics. In 1967, he became a member of the Heidelberg Academy of Sciences.

== Publications ==
- Definite terms and predictable numbers., Semester reports for the care of the relationship between university and school from the mathematical seminars, Münster 1937, 110–123.
- An axiomatization of general mechanics., Research on logic and the foundations of the exact sciences, Issue 3, Leipzig, 1938.
- Machines for decision of mathematical problems., Mathematics and Physical semester reports (Göttingen) (1952), 179–189.
- The universality of program-controlled computing machines., Mathematics and Physical semester reports (Göttingen) 4 (1954), 42–53.
- Introduction to lattice theory. Berlin – Göttingen – Heidelberg 1955 2 Advanced edition 1967
- Enumerability – Decidability – predictability. Introduction to the theory of recursive functions., Berlin – Göttingen – Heidelberg 1961 2 Edition 1971 (as Heidelberg Paperback).
- Introduction to Mathematical Logic – Classical predicate logic. Teubner Verlag, Stuttgart 1963, 2nd expanded edition in 1969.
- A Term logic with choice operator., Berlin, 1965.
- Recursive functions., With Klaus Heidler and Friedrich-K. Mahn, Mannheim – Vienna – Zurich 1977.
- Figures and games., Heinz-Dieter Ebbinghaus, Friedrich Hirzebruch, Hermes, among other things: numbers, Springer-Verlag, 3rd Edition 1992
- Decision problem and domino games. inc Konrad Jacobs (ed.) Selecta Mathematica II, Springer, Heidelberg paperbacks, 1970
- Foundations of mathematics., with Werner Markwald, in Behnke, sweet, Fladt: Principles of Mathematics, Vol.1, 1958, Vandenhoeck and Ruprecht
- Mathematical Logic, Encyclopedia of Mathematical Sciences., with Heinrich Scholz New Series, 1952
- Theory of Associations, Encyclopedia of Mathematical Sciences., with Gottfried Köthe New Series, 1939
