= Proof mining =

In proof theory, a branch of mathematical logic, proof mining (or proof unwinding) is a research program that studies or analyzes formalized proofs, especially in analysis, to obtain explicit bounds, ranges or rates of convergence from proofs that, when expressed in natural language, appear to be nonconstructive. This research has led to improved results in analysis obtained from the analysis of classical proofs.
