= International Union of History and Philosophy of Science and Technology =

Global scientific union

- IUHPST
- Abbreviation: IUHPST
- Formation: 1955; 71 years ago
- Type: INGO
- Region served: Worldwide
- Official language: English
- President: Valentin Goranko
- Parent organization: International Science Council
- Website: iuhpst.org

The International Union of History and Philosophy of Science and Technology is one of the members of the International Science Council (ISC). It was founded in 1955 by merging the International Union of History of Science (IUHS) and the International Union of Philosophy of Science (IUPS), and consists of two divisions, the Division of History of Science and Technology (DHST) and the Division of Logic, Methodology and Philosophy of Science and Technology (DLMPST).

== Structure and governance ==
The IUHPST does not have its own membership structure and governance, but is an umbrella organisation for its two Divisions, DHST and DLMPST. It is governed by the officers of the two Divisions in a rotational system where the Presidency of the Union rotates between the Presidents of the two Divisions. The current IUHPST President is Valentin Goranko (President of DLMPST), the current IUHPST Vice President is Janet Browne (President of DHST), the current IUHPST Secretary General is Eleonora Cresto (Secretary General of DLMPST), and the current IUHPST Treasurer is Pierre Edouard Bour (Treasurer of DLMPST).

== DHST ==
DHST Logo

The Division of History of Science and Technology (DHST) is an international non-governmental organisation devoted to international cooperation in the fields of history of science across the world. Together with the Division of Logic, Methodology, and Philosophy of Science and Technology (DLMPST), the DHST forms one of the two divisions of the International Union of History and Philosophy of Science and Technology, representing the field of history of science in the International Science Council (ISC). The DHST is a member organisation of the Conseil international de la philosophie et des sciences humaines (CIPSH). In May 2021, DHST and the International Union of Pure and Applied Physics (IUPAP) created the Inter-Union Commission on the History and Philosophy of Physics (IUCHPP). The commission is recognized as an IUPAP affiliated commission (AC6).

The DHST organizes an international congress every four years, and coordinates the activities of numerous commissions. The members of DHST are 98 national members (represented by national committees for the history of science) and 26 international scientific unions.

=== Past congresses ===
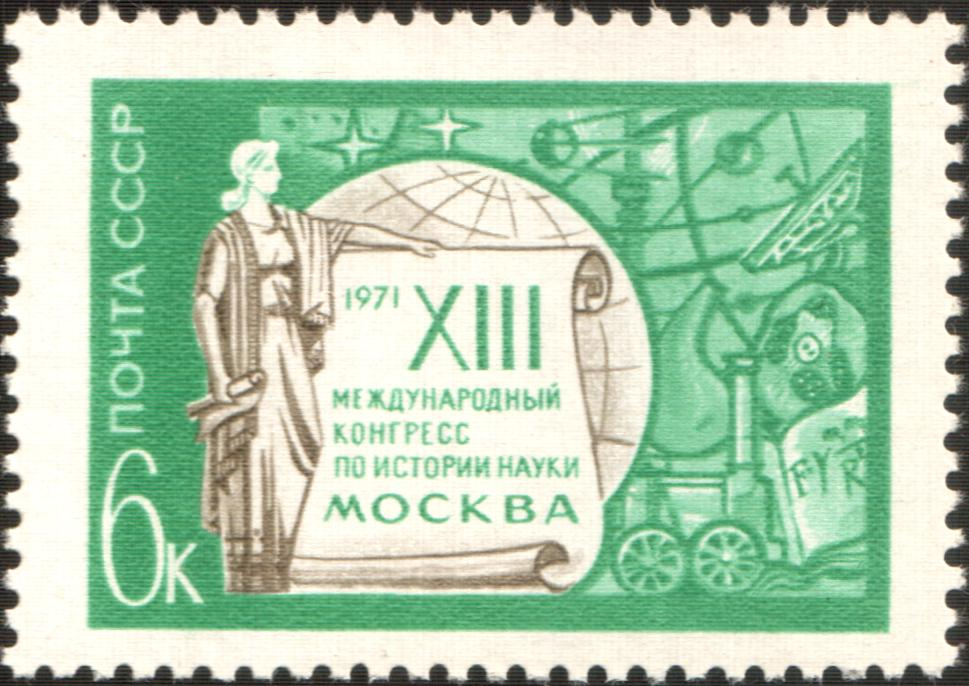
1971 USSR stamp, commemorating the 13th International Congress of History of Science held in Moscow that year

- ICHS I: Paris, France, 1929.
- ICHS II: London, 1931.
- ICHS III: Porto-Combra-Lisbon, Portugal, 1934.
- ICHS IV: Prague, Czechoslovakia, 22–27 September 1937; Science in the Eighteenth Century.
- ICHS V: Lausanne, Switzerland, 1947.
- ICHS VI: Amsterdam, Netherlands, 1950.
- ICHS VII: Jerusalem, Israel, 1953.
- ICHS VIII: Florence-Milan, Italy, 1956.
- ICHS IX: Barcelona-Madrid, Spain, 1959.
- ICHS X: Ithaca, US, 1962.
- ICHS XI: Warsaw-Kraków, Poland, 1965.
- ICHS XII: Paris, France, 1968.
- ICHS XIII: Moscow, USSR, 1971.
- ICHS XIV: Tokyo, Japan, 1974.
- ICHS XV: Edinburgh, Scotland, 1977; Human implications of scientific advance.
- ICHS XVI: Bucharest, Romania, 1981.
- ICHS XVII: Berkeley, US, 1985.
- ICHS XVIII: Hamburg, Germany, 1989; Science and religion.
- ICHS XIX: Zaragoza, Spain, 1993.
- ICHS XX: Liège, Belgium, 1997.
- ICHS XXI: Mexico City, Mexico, 2001; Science and cultural diversity.
- ICHS XXII: Beijing, China, 2005; Globalization and diversity: diffusion of science and technology throughout history.
- ICHST XXIII: Budapest, Hungary, 2009; Ideas and instruments in social context.
- ICHSTM XXIV: Manchester, England, 2013; Knowledge at work.
- ICHST XXV: Rio de Janeiro, Brazil, 2017; Science, Technology and Medicine between the Global and the Local.
- ICHST XXVI: Prague, Czech Republic, 2021; Giants and Dwarfs in Science, Technology and Medicine.
- ICHST XXVII: Dunedin, New Zealand, 2025; Peoples, Places, Exchanges, and Circulation.
- ICHST XXVIII: Paris, France, 2029.

=== Presidents ===
- Charles Singer (1947–1950)
- George Sarton (1950–1953)
- Louis de Broglie (1953–1956)
- Robert Jacobus Forbes (1956–1959)
- Vasco Ronchi (1959–1968)
- I. Bernard Cohen (1969–1971)
- Joseph Needham (1972–1974)
- René Taton (1975–1977)
- Patrick Suppes (1976, 1978)
- Ashot Grigoryan (1978–1981)
- Erwin Hiebert (1982–1985)
- Paolo Galluzzi (1986–1989)
- William Shea (1990–1993)
- Robert Fox (1993–1997)
- Bidare Venk Subbarayappa (1997–2001)
- Ekmeleddin Ihsanoglu (2001–2005)
- Ronald Numbers (2005–2009)
- Liu Dun (2009–2013)
- Efthymios Nicolaidis (2013–2017)
- Michael Osborne (2017–2021)
- Marcos Cueto (2021–2025)
- Janet Browne (2025-2029)

=== Current council ===
The current (2021–2025) DHST council consists of the executive members Janet Browne (president), Ana Simões (president elect), Silvia Figueirõa (first vice president), Hamish Spencer (second vice president), Thomás Haddad (secretary general), Maarten Bullynck (treasurer), Sam Robinson (engagement secretary), Milada Sekyrková (assistant secretary general), and the assessors David Aubin, Xingbo Luo, Gordon McOuat, Peeter Müürsepp, Donald Opitz, and Mai Sugimoto.

== DLMPST ==
DLMPST logo

The Division of Logic, Methodology and Philosophy of Science and Technology (DLMPST) is an international non-governmental organisation devoted to international cooperation in the fields of logic and philosophy of science across the world. Together with the Division of History of Science and Technology (DHST), the DLMPST forms one of the two divisions of the International Union of History and Philosophy of Science and Technology, representing the fields of logic and philosophy of science in the International Science Council (ISC).

The DLMPST is a member organisation of the Conseil international de la philosophie et des sciences humaines (CIPSH). Until 2015, the DLMPST was called Division of Logic, Methodology and Philosophy of Science.

The main activity of the DLMPST is the organization of the Congress for Logic, Philosophy and Methodology of Science and Technology (CLMPST) every four years.

=== Past and planned congresses ===
- CLMPS I: Stanford, United States, 1960.
- CLMPS II: Jerusalem, Israel, 1964.
- CLMPS III: Amsterdam, Netherlands, 1967.
- CLMPS IV: Bucharest, Romania, 1971.
- CLMPS V: London, Canada, 1975.
- CLMPS VI: Hannover, Germany, 1979.
- CLMPS VII: Salzburg, Austria, 1983.
- CLMPS VIII: Moscow, Soviet Union, 1987.
- CLMPS IX: Uppsala, Sweden, 1991.
- CLMPS X: Florence, Italy, 1995.
- CLMPS XI: Kraków, Poland, 1999.
- CLMPS XII: Oviedo, Spain, 2003.
- CLMPS XIII: Beijing, China, 2007.
- CLMPS XIV: Nancy, France, 2011; Logic and Science Facing the New Technologies.
- CLMPS XV: Helsinki, Finland, 2015; Models and Modelling.
- CLMPST XVI: Prague, Czech Republic, 2019; Bridging Across Academic Cultures.
- CLMPST XVII: Buenos Aires, Argentina, 2023; Science and Values in an Uncertain World.
- CLMPST XVIII: Kobe, Japan, 2027; Dialogues Across Borders.

=== Presidents ===
	Name	Term of office
1st President	Stephen Cole Kleene	
2nd President	Georg Henrik von Wright	1963–1965
3rd President	Yehoshua Bar-Hillel	1966–1969
4th President	Stephan Körner	1969–1971
5th President	Andrzej Mostowski	1971–1975
6th President	Jaakko Hintikka	1975
7th President	Patrick Suppes	1975–1979
8th President	Jerzy Łoś	1979–1983
9th President	Dana Scott	1983–1987
10th President	Lawrence Jonathan Cohen	1987–1991
11th President	Jens Erik Fenstad	1991–1995
12th President	Wesley Salmon	1995–1999
13th President	Michael Rabin	1999–2003
14th President	Adolf Grünbaum	2003–2007
15th President	Wilfrid Hodges	2007–2011
16th President	Elliott Sober	2011–2015
17th President	Menachem Magidor	2016–2019
18th President	Nancy Cartwright	2020–2023
19th President	Valentin Goranko	2024–2027

=== Current DLMPST council ===
The council of the DLMPST consists of the executive committee and ten assessors. The current members of the executive committee of the DLMPST are Valentin Goranko (President), Sandra Mitchell (First Vice President), Mitsuhiro Okada (Second Vice President), Nancy Cartwright (Past President), Eleonora Cresto (Secretary General), and Pierre Édouard Bour (treasurer). The assessors are Atocha Aliseda, Agnes Bolinska, Juliet Floyd, Valeria Giardino, Sabina Leonelli, Fenrong Liu, Marco Panza, and Giuseppe Primiero.

=== Past DLMPST council members ===
In addition to the past presidents, past council members include:

- Samson Abramsky (Assessor 2016–2019)
- Evandro Agazzi (Assessor 1975–1979)
- Kazimierz Ajdukiewicz (Vice President 1960–1962)
- Hanne Andersen (Assessor 2020-2023)
- Alan Ross Anderson (Secretary General 1966–1969)
- Daniel Andler (Second Vice President 2004–2007)
- Rachel Ankeny (Assessor 2015-2023)
- Günter Asser (Alternate Assessor 1987–1991)
- Sir Alfred Ayer (Second Vice President 1973–1975)
- Ruth Barcan Marcus (Alternate Assessor 1975–1979)
- Verónica Becher (Second Vice President 2020-2023)
- Karel Berka (Assessor 1979–1983)
- Max Black (Assessor 1966–1969)
- Richard Bevan Braithwaite (Assessor 1963–1965)
- Mario Bunge (Assessor 1969–1971)
- Jeremy Butterfield (Assessor 2008–2011)
- Amita Chatterjee (Second Vice President 2016–2019)
- Rolando Chuaqui (Assessor 1991–1995)
- Newton da Costa (Assessor 2008–2011)
- Valeria de Paiva (Assessor 2020–2023)
- Dennis Dieks (Assessor 2012–2015)
- Heather Douglas (Assessor 2016–2019)
- Yuri Yershov (Alternate Assessor 1983–1987)
- Anne Fagot-Largeault (Assessor 2000–2003; Second Vice President 2008–2011)
- Peter R. H. Forrest (Assessor 1991–1995)
- Hans Freudenthal (Treasurer 1960–1969)
- Haim Gaifman (First Vice President 2004–2007)
- Maria Carla Galavotti (Assessor 2004–2007; First Vice President 2012–2015)
- Peter Gärdenfors (Assessor 1995–1999)
- Paul Gochet (Assessor 1983–1987)
- Andrzej Grzegorczyk (Assessor 1969–1971)
- Ian Hacking (Alternate Assessor 1979–1983)
- Petr Hájek (First Vice President 1995–1999)
- András Hajnal (Second Vice President 1983–1987)
- Rudolf Haller (Assessor 2004–2007)
- Gerhard Heinzmann (Assessor 2012–2015, 2020–2023)
- Mary Hesse (Assessor 1971–1975)
- Risto Hilpinen (Secretary General 1983–1991)
- Gürol Irzık (Assessor 2004–2007)
- Hidé Ishiguro (Assessor 1991–1995)
- László Kalmár (Vice President 1963–1965)
- Jean-Louis Krivine (Assessor 1987–1991)
- Hannes Leitgeb (Assessor 2016–2019)
- Azriel Lévy (Assessor 1979–1983)
- Peter Lipton (Assessor 2000–2003)
- Benedikt Löwe (Assistant Secretary General 2012-2015; Secretary General 2016-2023)
- Helen Longino (First Vice President 2016–2019)
- Paul Lorenzen (Assessor 1963–1965)
- Michael Makkai (Assessor 1987–1991)
- Andrey Andreyevich Markov Jr. (Vice President 1969–1971; First Vice President 1975–1979)
- Deborah Mayo (Second Vice President 2000–2003)
- David Hugh Mellor (Assessor 1983–1987)
- Grigori Mints (Assessor 1991–1995)
- Grigore Moisil (Alternate Assessor 1966–1969; Second Vice President 1971–1973)
- Gert H. Müller (Second Vice President 1979–1983)
- Nancy J. Nersessian (Assessor 2012–2015)
- Ilkka Niiniluoto (Assessor 2012–2015)
- Janusz Onyszkiewicz (Assessor 1983–1987)
- Dag Prawitz (Assessor 1987–1991; First Vice President 1991–1995)
- Graham Priest (First Vice President 2000–2003)
- Joëlle Proust (Assessor 2008–2011)
- Marian Przełęcki (Alternate Assessor 1975–1979)
- Dhruv Raina (Assessor 2020-2023)
- Helena Rasiowa (Alternate Assessor 1971–1975; Assessor 1975–1979)
- Alexander Razborov (Assessor 2000–2003)
- Michael Redhead (Assessor 1995–1999)
- Qiu Renzong (Assessor 1995–1999)
- Nicholas Rescher (Secretary General 1969–1975)
- Michael Ruse (Alternate Assessor 1983–1987)
- Gerald E. Sacks (Assessor 1975–1979)
- Vadim Sadovsky (Assessor 1975–1979)
- Peter Schroeder-Heister (Secretary General 2012–2015; Treasurer 2016–2019)
- John Jamieson Carswell Smart (Assessor 1979–1983)
- Vladimir Smirnov (Assessor 1979–1983)
- Ernst Specker (Assessor 1966–1969)
- Frits Staal (Treasurer 1969–1975)
- Friedrich Stadler (Assessor 2008–2011)
- Wolfgang Stegmüller (Assessor 1971–1975)
- Kim Sterelny (First Vice President 2020-2023),
- Sōshichi Uchii (Assessor 2000–2003; First Vice President 2008–2011)
- Alasdair Urquhart (Assessor 2020-2023)
- Dirk van Dalen (Second Vice President 1987–1991)
- Bas Van Fraassen (Assessor 1983–1987)
- Anders Wedberg (Alternate Assessor 1966–1969)
- Paul Weingartner (Assessor 1979–1983; First Vice President 1983–1987)
- Charlotte Werndl (Assessor 2016–2019)
- Dag Westerståhl (Secretary General 2000–2007 & 2011)
