= International Academy of Philosophy of Science =

Académie Internationale de Philosophie des Sciences
- Abbreviation: AIPS
- Formation: 1947; 79 years ago
- Type: INGO
- President: Jure Zovko
- Website: www.aips.be/en

The International Academy for Philosophy of Science, better known as the Académie Internationale de Philosophie des Sciences (AIPS) is an international organization located in Brussels, which promotes fundamental issues of philosophy of science in an open interdisciplinary dialogue. Its members are philosophers of science or leading experts in sciences interested in philosophical questions.

== History ==
The AIPS was created in 1947 by Stanislas Dockx. Among its first members were Paul Bernays, E W Beth, Józef Maria Bocheński, Niels Bohr, Émile Borel, L. E. J. Brouwer, Louis de Broglie, Albert Einstein, Ferdinand Gonseth, E A Milne, and Hermann Weyl. In 1991, the academy was made an International Member of the International Union of History and Philosophy of Science, Division of Logic, Methodology and Philosophy of Science (IUHPS/DLMPS).

== Organization ==
The AIPS consists of full members (membres titulaires), corresponding members (membres correspondants), and emeritus members (membres émérites) who are elected at the general annual meeting on presentation of the Academic Council (Conseil Académique). The Council consists of a President, two vice-presidents, two Assessors and a Secretary General. The current President is Jure Zovko (Zadar); the list of former presidents includes Evandro Agazzi (Genoa) and Gerhard Heinzmann (Nancy). Other members of the current Council are Michel Ghins, Reinhard Kahle, Gino Tarozzi, and Marco Buzzoni. Since 1949, the AIPS organises a series of annual conferences, usually in Europe with notable exceptions (New York 1977 and Lima 1989).

The AIPS publishes an open access book series called Comptes Rendus de l'Académie Internationale de Philosophie des Sciences (C.R.AIPS) supported by the Institute for Logic, Language and Computation of the Universiteit van Amsterdam. The editor of the book series is Benedikt Löwe.

== Members ==
The AIPS currently has over one hundred members, among them

- Evandro Agazzi
- Susanne Bobzien
- Mario Bunge†
- Jeremy Butterfield
- Nancy Cartwright
- Gregory Chaitin
- Noam Chomsky
- Newton da Costa†
- Michael Detlefsen†
- Dennis Dieks
- John Earman
- Luciano Floridi
- Tamaz Gamkrelidze†
- Ian Hacking†
- Gerhard Heinzmann
- Hannes Leitgeb
- Sabina Leonelli
- Benedikt Löwe
- Lorenzo Magnani
- Michela Massimi
- Tim Maudlin
- Ilkka Niiniluoto
- John D. Norton
- Steven Pinker
- Stathis Psillos
- Nicholas Rescher
- John Searle
- Elliott Sober
- Bas van Fraassen
- Charlotte Werndl
