= Hanne Andersen =

Hanne Andersen is the name of:

- Hanne Andersen (philosopher) (born 1964), Danish philosopher
- Hanne Andersen (politician) (1939–2024), Danish politician
