= Heather Douglas =

Heather Douglas may refer to:

- Heather Douglas (philosopher) (born 1969), philosopher of science
- Heather Douglas, fictional character. Also known as Moondragon.
