= Feist =

Feist may refer to:

== People ==
- Feist (singer) (born 1976), Canadian indie pop singer-songwriter and guitarist
- Felix E. Feist (1910–1965), American film and television director and writer
- Gene Feist (1923–2014), American playwright, theater director and co-founder of the Roundabout Theater Company
- Gregory J. Feist (born 1961), American psychologist
- Leo Feist (1869–1930), publisher of popular American music
- Margot Honecker (née Feist; 1927–2016), East German politician
- Mathias Feist (born 1961), ChessBase and Fritz programmer
- Rainer Feist (1945–2007), officer in the German Navy
- Raymond E. Feist (born 1945), American fantasy fiction author
- Sigmund Feist (1865–1943), German Jewish pedagogue and historical linguist

== Other uses ==
- Feist (dog), a small hunting dog
- Feist (video game), an action video game for PlayStation 4, Linux, OS X, Windows, and Xbox One
- Feist Publications, Inc., v. Rural Telephone Service Co. (also Feist), a decision by the Supreme Court of the United States
