= Gerhard Heinzmann =

German philosopher (born 1950)

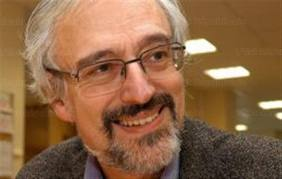
- Born: 12 October 1950 (age 75); Freiburg im Breisgau, Germany

Education
- Doctoral advisor: Kuno Lorenz

Philosophical work
- School: analytic philosophy, Erlangen constructivism
- Institutions: Université de Lorraine
- Main interests: philosophy of logic, philosophy of mathematics, history of science, philosophy of language

Gerhard Heinzmann (born 12 October 1950 in Freiburg im Breisgau is a German philosopher and Professor of Philosophy at the Université de Lorraine.

He is known for his work on the philosophy of Henri Poincaré and founded the Archives Henri Poincaré in Nancy in 1992. He is an editor of the journal Philosophia Scientiae and of the Publications des Archives Henri Poincaré and a member of the Academia Europaea, the European Academy of Sciences, the Institut International de Philosophie and the Académie Internationale de Philosophie des Sciences.; He was director of the Maison des Sciences de l’Homme Lorraine from 2007 to 2014, member of the Council of the Division for Logic, Methodology and Philosophy of Science and Technology of the International Union of History and Philosophy of Science and Technology from 2012 to 2015 and from 2020 to 2023, and he was the President of the Académie Internationale de Philosophie des Sciences (2014-2021).
