= Scandinavian Logic Society =

Scandinavian academic organization that focuses on logic

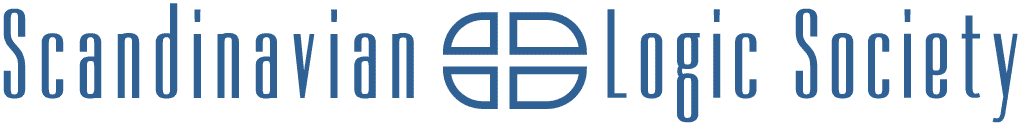
- Abbreviation: SLS
- Formation: 2012; 14 years ago
- Headquarters: Stockholm, Sweden
- Fields: logic, computer science, philosophy, mathematics, linguistics
- President: Valentin Goranko
- Website: scandinavianlogic.org

The Scandinavian Logic Society, abbreviated as SLS, is a not-for-profit organization with objective to organize, promote, and support logic-related events and other activities of relevance for the development of logic-related research and education in the Nordic Region of Europe.

The society is a member of the Division of Logic, Methodology and Philosophy of Science and Technology.

== History ==
The SLS was founded on 20 August 2012, at the 8th Scandinavian Logic Symposium in Roskilde, Denmark. Today the society has its seat in Stockholm, Sweden. It unites academics from Denmark, Finland, Iceland, Norway and Sweden working primarily on theory and applications of logic to computer science, philosophy, mathematics and linguistics.

== Presidents ==
The SLS is led by Executive Committee.

The presidents of the SLS:

- 2012-2017 Dag Normann
- 2017–present Valentin Goranko

== Main activities ==
=== Scandinavian Logic Symposium (SLSS) ===
The Society organizes regular Scandinavian Logic Symposia (SLSS) every 2–4 years on a geographically rotating principle. The primary aim of the Symposium is to promote research in the field of logic (broadly conceived) carried out in research communities in Scandinavia.

==== Past symposia ====
- 1968: 1st symposium in Åbo/Turku, Finland
- 1971: 2nd symposium in Oslo, Norway
- 1973: 3rd symposium in Uppsala, Sweden
- 1976: 4th symposium in Jyväskylä, Finland
- 1979: 5th symposium in Aalborg, Denmark
- 1982: 6th symposium in Telemark, Norway
- 1996: 7th symposium in Uppsala, Sweden
- 2012: 8th symposium in Roskilde, Denmark
- 2014: 9th symposium in Tampere, Finland
- 2018: 10th symposium in Gothenburg, Sweden
- 2022: 11th symposium in Bergen, Norway

11th symposium scheduled for 2020 in Bergen, Norway, was postponed for 2022 due to pandemic of COVID-19

=== Nordic Logic (Summer) School (NLS) ===
The Society organizes regular Nordic Logic Schools every 2–4 years. The intended audience is advanced master students, PhD-students, postdocs and experienced researchers wishing to learn the state of the art in a particular subject.

==== Past schools ====
- 2013: 1st summer school in Nordfjordeid, Norway
- 2015: 2nd summer school in Helsinki, Finland
- 2017: 3rd summer school in Stockholm, Sweden
- 2022: 4th summer school in Bergen, Norway

4th summer school scheduled for 2020 in Bergen, Norway, was postponed for 2022 due to pandemic of COVID-19

=== General meetings of the SLS ===
General meetings of the Society are held regularly during the Scandinavian Logic Symposium.

== Membership ==
Membership in the SLS is open to all interested persons who agree with and support the objectives of the Society.

== See also ==
- International Union of History and Philosophy of Science
- Association for Symbolic Logic
- World Logic Day
- Thoralf Skolem
