= Free will in antiquity =

Philosophical and theological concept

Free will in antiquity is a philosophical and theological concept. Free will in antiquity was not discussed in the same terms as used in the modern free will debates, but historians of the problem have speculated who exactly was first to take positions as determinist, libertarian, and compatibilist in antiquity. There is wide agreement that these views were essentially fully formed over 2000 years ago. Candidates for the first thinkers to form these views, as well as the idea of a non-physical "agent-causal" libertarianism, include Democritus (460–370 BC), Aristotle (384–322 BC), Epicurus (341–270 BC), Chrysippus (280–207 BC), and Carneades (214–129 BC).

== Ancient Greek philosophy ==
=== Aristotle ===
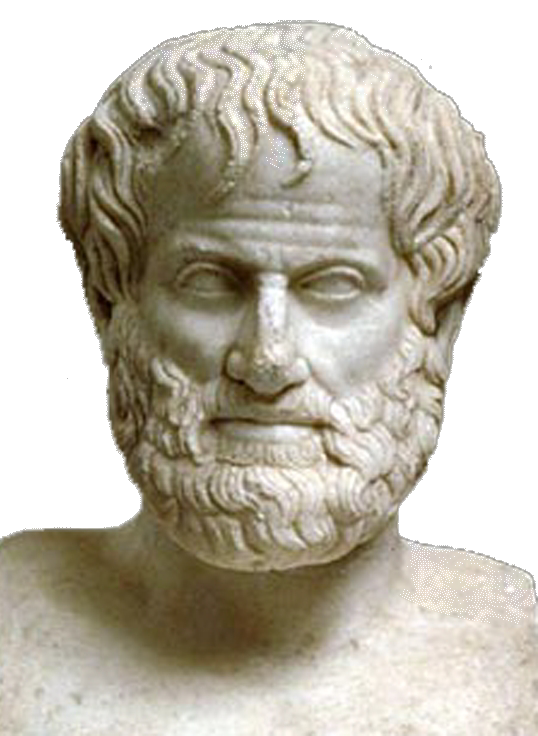
Aristotle

Michael Frede typifies the prevailing view of recent scholarship, namely that Aristotle did not have a notion of free-will.

Aristotle elaborated the four possible causes (material, efficient, formal, and final). Aristotle's word for these causes was ἀιτία, which translates as "causes" in the sense of the multiple factors responsible for an event. Aristotle did not subscribe to the simplistic "every event has a (single) cause" idea that was to come later.

Then, in his Physics and Metaphysics, Aristotle also said there were "accidents" caused by "chance (τυχή)". In his Physics, he noted that the early physicists had found no place for chance among their causes.

Aristotle opposed his accidental chance to necessity:

Nor is there any definite cause for an accident, but only chance (τυχόν), namely an indefinite (ἀόριστον) cause.

It is obvious that there are principles and causes which are generable and destructible apart from the actual processes of generation and destruction; for if this is not true, everything will be of necessity: that is, if there must necessarily be some cause, other than accidental, of that which is generated and destroyed. Will this be, or not? Yes, if this happens; otherwise not.

Tracing any particular sequence of events back in time will usually come to an accidental event – a "starting point" or "fresh start" (Aristotle calls it an origin or arche (ἀρχή) – whose major contributing cause (or causes) was itself uncaused.

Whether a particular thing happens, says Aristotle, may depend on a series of causes that

goes back to some starting-point, which does not go back to something else. This, therefore, will be the starting-point of the fortuitous, and nothing else is the cause of its generation.

In general, many such causal sequences contribute to any event, including human decisions. Each sequence has a different time of origin, some going back before we were born, some originating during our deliberations. Beyond causal sequences that are the result of chance or necessity, Aristotle felt that some breaks in the causal chain allow us to feel our actions "depend on us" (ἐφ' ἡμῖν). These are the causal chains that originate within us (ἐv ἡμῖν).

Richard Sorabji's 1980 Necessity, Cause, and Blame surveyed Aristotle's positions on causation and necessity, comparing them to his predecessors and successors, especially the Stoics and Epicurus. Sorabji argues that Aristotle was an indeterminist, that real chance and uncaused events exist, but never that human actions are uncaused in the extreme libertarian sense that some commentators mistakenly attribute to Epicurus.

Aristotle accepted the past as fixed, in the sense that past events were irrevocable. But future events cannot be necessitated by claims about the present truth value of statements about the future. Aristotle does not deny the excluded middle (either p or not p), only that the truth value of p does not exist yet. Indeed, although the past is fixed, the truth value of past statements about the future can be changed by the outcome of future events. This is the problem of future contingents.

Although he thinks Aristotle was not aware of the "problem" of free will vis-a-vis determinism (as first described by Epicurus), Sorabji thinks Aristotle's position on the question is clear enough. Voluntariness is too important to fall before theoretical arguments about necessity and determinism.

I come now to the question of how determinism is related to involuntariness. Many commentators nowadays hold one or more parts of the following view. Determinism creates a problem for belief in the voluntariness of actions. Regrettably, but inevitably, Aristotle was unaware of this problem, and so failed to cope with it. Indeed, the problem was not discovered until Hellenistic times, perhaps by Epicurus, who was over forty years junior to Aristotle, and who reached Athens just too late to hear his lectures. In Aristotle's time no one had yet propounded a universal determinism, so that he knew of no such theory. His inevitable failure to see the threat to voluntariness is all the more regrettable in that he himself entertained a deterministic account of actions, which exacerbated the problem of how any could be voluntary. I shall argue that this account misrepresents the situation.

=== Epicureanism ===
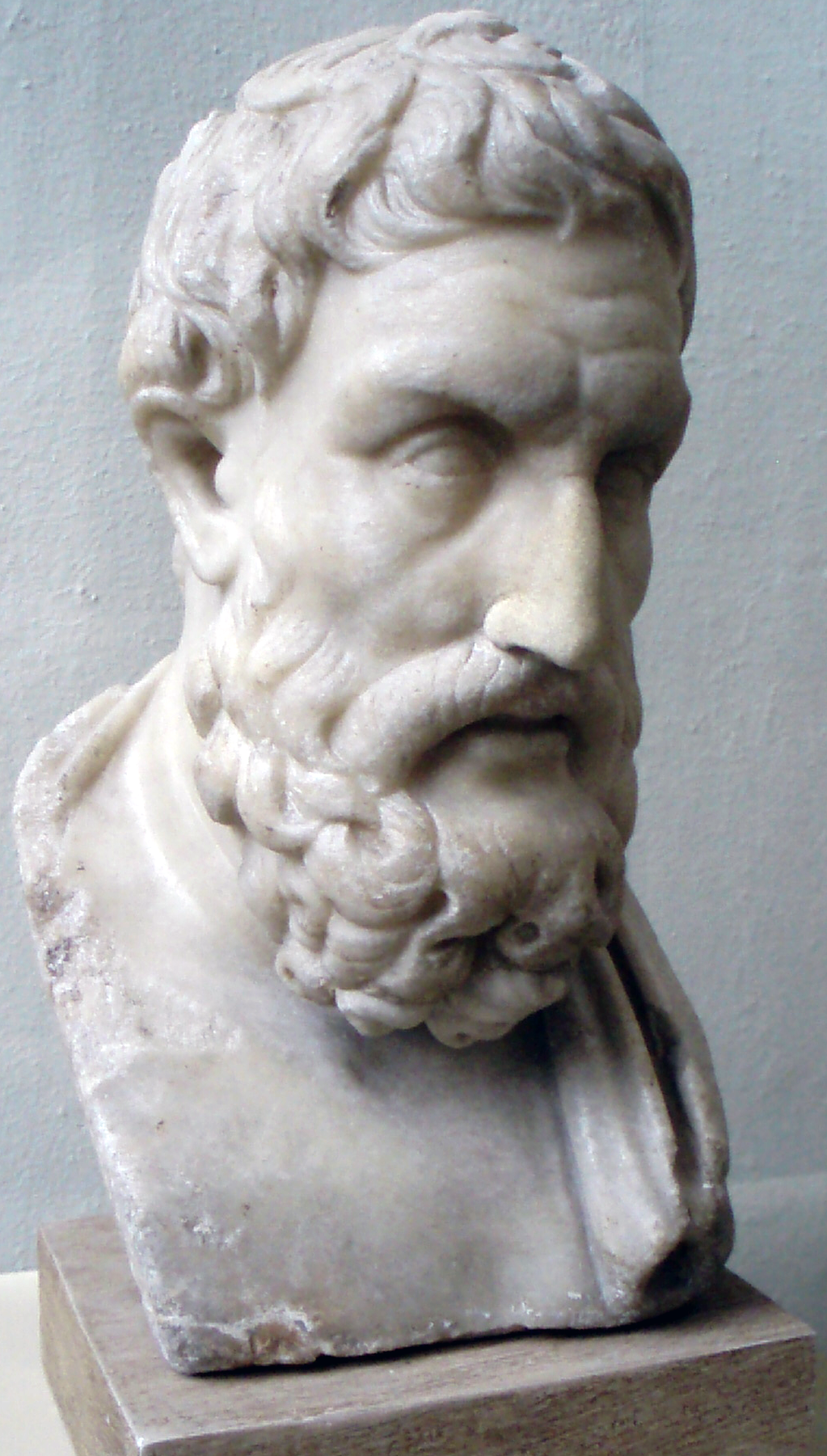
Epicurus

It is with Epicurus and the Stoics that clearly indeterministic and deterministic positions are first formulated. Writing one generation after Aristotle, Epicurus argued that as atoms moved through the void, there were occasions when they would "swerve" (clinamen) from their otherwise determined paths, thus initiating new causal chains. Epicurus argued that these swerves would allow us to be more responsible for our actions (libertarianism), something impossible if every action was deterministically caused.

Epicurus did not say the swerve was directly involved in decisions. But following Aristotle, Epicurus thought human agents have the autonomous ability to transcend necessity and chance (both of which destroy responsibility), so that praise and blame are appropriate. Epicurus finds a tertium quid (a third option), beyond necessity (Democritus' physics) and beyond Aristotle's chance. His tertium quid is agent autonomy, what is "up to us". Here is the first explicit argument for libertarian free will.

...some things happen of necessity (ἀνάγκη), others by chance (τύχη), others through our own agency (παρ’ ἡμᾶς).

...necessity destroys responsibility and chance is inconstant; whereas our own actions are autonomous, and it is to them that praise and blame naturally attach.

Lucretius (1st century BCE), a strong supporter of Epicurus, saw the randomness as enabling free will, even if he could not explain exactly how, beyond the fact that random swerves would break the causal chain of determinism.

Again, if all motion is always one long chain, and new motion arises out of the old in order invariable, and if the first-beginnings do not make by swerving a beginning of motion such as to break the decrees of fate, that cause may not follow cause from infinity, whence comes this freedom (libera) in living creatures all over the earth, whence I say is this will (voluntas) wrested from the fates by which we proceed whither pleasure leads each, swerving also our motions not at fixed times and fixed places, but just where our mind has taken us? For undoubtedly it is his own will in each that begins these things, and from the will movements go rippling through the limbs.

In 1967, Pamela Huby suggested that Epicurus was the original discoverer of the "free-will problem". Huby noted that there had been two main free-will problems, corresponding to different determinisms, namely theological determinism (predestination and foreknowledge) and the physical causal determinism of Democritus.

It is unfortunate that our knowledge of the early history of the Stoics is so fragmentary, and that we have no agreed account of the relations between them and Epicurus. On the evidence we have, however, it seems to me more probable that Epicurus was the originator of the freewill controversy, and that it was only taken up with enthusiasm among the Stoics by Chrysippus, the third head of the school.

In 2000, Susanne Bobzien challenged Pamela Huby's 1967 assertion that Epicurus discovered the "free-will problem".

In 1967 Epicurus was credited with the discovery of the problem of free will and determinism. Among the contestants were Aristotle and the early Stoics. Epicurus emerged victorious, because – so the argument went – Aristotle did not yet have the problem, and the Stoics inherited it from Epicurus. In the same year David Furley published his essay 'Aristotle and Epicurus on Voluntary Action', in which he argued that Epicurus' problem was not the free will problem. In the thirty-odd years since then, a lot has been published about Epicurus on freedom and determinism. But it has only rarely been questioned whether Epicurus, in one way or another, found himself face to face with some version of the free will problem.

Bobzien thinks Epicurus did not have a model of what she calls "two-sided freedom," because she believes that Epicurus

"assumed....a gap in the causal chain immediately before, or simultaneously with, the decision or choice, a gap which allows the coming into being of a spontaneous motion. In this way every human decision or choice is directly linked with causal indeterminism....To avoid misunderstandings, I should stress that I do believe that Epicurus was an indeterminist of sorts – only that he did not advocate indeterminist free decision or indeterminist free choice.

A. A. Long and D. N. Sedley, however, agree with Pamela Huby that Epicurus was the first to notice the modern problem of free will and determinism.

Epicurus' problem is this: if it has been necessary all along that we should act as we do, it cannot be up to us, with the result that we would not be morally responsible for our actions at all. Thus posing the problem of determinism he becomes arguably the first philosopher to recognize the philosophical centrality of what we know as the Free Will Question. His strongly libertarian approach to it can be usefully contrasted with the Stoics' acceptance of determinism.

The question remains how random swerves can help to explain free action. In her 1992 book, The Hellenistic Philosophy of Mind, Julia Annas wrote:

...since swerves are random, it is hard to see how they help to explain free action. We can scarcely expect there to be a random swerve before every free action. Free actions are frequent, and (fairly) reliable. Random swerves cannot account for either of these features. This problem would be lessened if we could assume that swerves are very frequent, so that there is always likely to be one around before an action. However, if swerves are frequent, we face the problem that stones and trees ought to be enabled to act freely. And even in the case of humans random swerves would seem to produce, if anything, random actions; we still lack any clue as to how they could produce actions which are free.

One view, going back to the 19th century historian Carlo Giussani, is that Epicurus' atomic swerves are involved directly in every case of human free action, not just somewhere in the past that breaks the causal chain of determinism. In 1928 Cyril Bailey agreed with Giussani that the atoms of the mind-soul provide a break in the continuity of atomic motions, otherwise actions would be necessitated. Bailey imagined complexes of mind-atoms that work together to form a consciousness that is not determined, but also not susceptible to the pure randomness of individual atomic swerves, something that could constitute Epicurus' idea of actions being "up to us" (πὰρ' ἡμάς). Bailey states that Epicurus did not identify freedom of the will with chance.

It may be that [Giussani's] account presses the Epicurean doctrine slightly beyond the point to which the master had thought it out for himself, but it is a direct deduction from undoubted Epicurean conceptions and is a satisfactory explanation of what Epicurus meant: that he should have thought that the freedom of the will was chance, and fought hard to maintain it as chance and no more, is inconceivable.

In 1967 David Furley de-emphasized the importance of the swerve in both Epicurus and Lucretius so as to defend Epicurus from the "extreme" libertarian view that our actions are caused directly by random swerves. (Bailey had also denied this "traditional interpretation".) Furley argues for a strong connection between the ideas of Aristotle and Epicurus on autonomous actions that are "up to us".

If we now put together the introduction to Lucretius' passage on voluntas and Aristotle's theory of the voluntary, we can see how the swerve of atoms was supposed to do its work. Aristotle's criterion of the voluntary was a negative one: the source of the voluntary action is in the agent himself, in the sense that it cannot be traced back beyond or outside the agent himself. Lucretius says that voluntas must be saved from a succession of causes which can be traced back to infinity. All he needs to satisfy the Aristotelian criterion is a break in the succession of causes, so that the source of an action cannot be traced back to something occurring before the birth of the agent.

The swerve, then, plays a purely negative part in Epicurean psychology. It saves voluntas from necessity, as Lucretius says it does, but it does not feature in every act of voluntas.

On the other hand, in his 1983 thesis, "Lucretius on the Clinamen and 'Free Will'", Don Paul Fowler defended the ancient claim that Epicurus proposed random swerves as directly causing our actions.

I turn to the overall interpretation. Lucretius is arguing from the existence of voluntas to the existence of the clinamen; nothing comes to be out of nothing, therefore voluntas must have a cause at the atomic level, viz. the clinamen. The most natural interpretation of this is that every act of voluntas is caused by a swerve in the atoms of the animal's mind....There is a close causal, physical relationship between the macroscopic and the atomic. Furley, however, argued that the relationship between voluntas and the clinamen was very different; not every act of volition was accompanied by a swerve in the soul-atoms, but the clinamen was only an occasional event which broke the chain of causation between the σύστασις of our mind at birth and the 'engendered' state (τὸ ἀπογεγεννημένον) which determines our actions.Its role in Epicureanism is merely to make a formal break with physical determinism, and it has no real effect on the outcome of particular actions. (p. 338).

In a 1999 Phronesis article, Purinton agreed with Fowler that random swerves directly cause volitions and actions:

"since they do not make volition itself a fresh start of motion, and Sedley's view does not do justice to his atomism...It seems to me, therefore, that there is no good reason to reject the thesis that Epicurus held that swerves cause volitions from the bottom up. And there are a number of good reasons to accept it."

=== Stoicism ===
The Stoics solidified the idea of natural laws controlling all things, including the mind. Zeno of Citium, the founder of Stoicism, saw that every event had a cause, and that cause necessitated the event. Given exactly the same circumstances, exactly the same result will occur.

It is impossible that the cause be present yet that of which it is the cause not obtain.

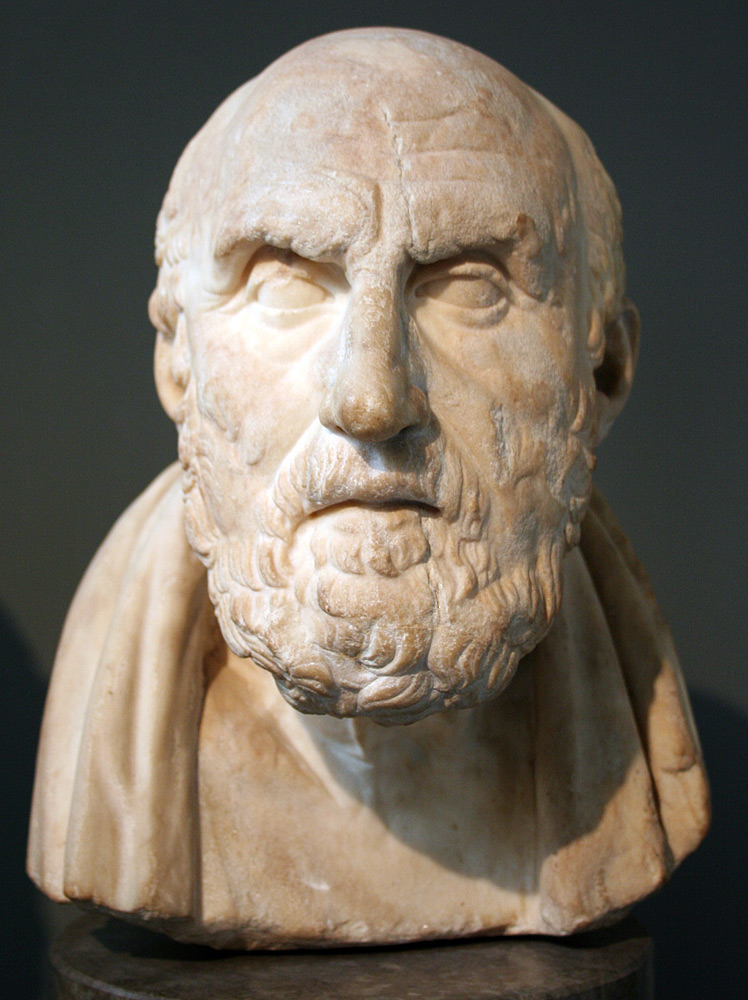
The Stoic philosopher Chrysippus

The major developer of Stoicism, Chrysippus, took the edge off of strict necessity. Whereas the past is unchangeable, Chrysippus argued that some future events that are possible do not occur by necessity from past external factors alone, but might (as Aristotle and Epicurus maintained) depend on us. We have a choice to assent or not to assent to an action. Chrysippus said our actions are determined (in part by ourselves as causes) and fated (because of God's foreknowledge), but he also said that they are not necessitated, i.e., pre-determined from the distant past. Chrysippus would be seen today as a compatibilist.

R. W. Sharples describes the first compatibilist arguments to reconcile responsibility and determinism by Chrysippus

The Stoic position, given definitive expression by Chrysippus (c. 280–207 BC), the third head of the school, represents not the opposite extreme from that of Epicurus but an attempt to compromise, to combine determinism and responsibility. Their theory of the universe is indeed a completely deterministic one; everything is governed by fate, identified with the sequence of causes; nothing could happen otherwise than it does, and in any given set of circumstances one and only one result can follow – otherwise an uncaused motion would occur.

Chrysippus was concerned to preserve human responsibility in the context of his determinist system. His position was thus one of 'soft determinism', as opposed on the one hand to that of the 'hard determinist' who claims that determinism excludes responsibility, and on the other to that of the libertarian who agrees on the incompatibility but responsibility by determinism. The Greek to eph' hemin (ἐφ΄ ἡμῖν), 'what depends on us', like the English 'responsibility', was used both by libertarians and by soft determinists, though they differed as to what it involved; thus he occurrence of the expression is not a safe guide to the type of position involved. The situation is complicated by the fact that the debate is in Greek philosophy conducted entirely in terms of responsibility (to eph' hemin) rather than of freedom or free will; nevertheless it can be shown that some thinkers, Alexander among them, have a libertarian rather than a soft-determinist conception of responsibility, and in such cases I have not hesitated to use expressions like 'freedom'.

=== Alexander of Aphrodisias ===
The Peripatetic philosopher Alexander of Aphrodisias (c. 150–210), the most famous of the ancient commentators on Aristotle, defended a view of moral responsibility we would call libertarianism today. Greek philosophy had no precise term for "free will" as did Latin (liberum arbitrium or libera voluntas). The discussion was in terms of responsibility, what "depends on us" (in Greek ἐφ ἡμῖν).

Alexander believed that Aristotle was not a strict determinist like the Stoics, and Alexander argued that some events do not have pre-determined causes. In particular, man is responsible for self-caused decisions, and can choose to do or not to do something, as Chrysippus argued. However, Alexander denied the foreknowledge of events that was part of the Stoic identification of God and Nature.

R. W. Sharples described Alexander's De Fato as perhaps the most comprehensive treatment surviving from classical antiquity of the problem of responsibility (τὸ ἐφ’ ἡμίν) and determinism. It especially shed a great deal of light on Aristotle's position on free will and on the Stoic attempt to make responsibility compatible with determinism.

== Ancient Abrahamic religion ==
=== Judaism ===
Jews during Second Temple Judaism (516 BC - 70 AD) were actually divided on the question of free-will. According to Josephus, the most deterministic ancient Jews were the Essenes (2nd c. BCE - 1st c. AD) and the Qumran sectarians. The Sadducees (2nd c. BC through 70 AD) and Ben Sira (fl. 2nd c. BC), held to a form of libertarianism. On their side, the Pharisees believed "that some actions, but not all, are the work of fate". They held to an intermediate position, close to libertarian free will, that can be called a "Jewish compatibilism", to be contrasted with “Stoic” or “Chrysippean” deterministic compatibilism."

=== Christianity ===
In concurrence with the Hebrew teaching on the subject (see above), the term "free will" is absent from scholarly translations of the New Testament, but some theologians still suggest that the notion of free will is implicit. Passionate debate has raged for centuries among scholars on both sides of the question. Christian denominations have often been divided on the question.

Dr. Alister McGrath, writes, “The term ‘free will’ is not biblical, but derives from Stoicism. It was introduced into Western Christianity by the second-century theologian Tertullian.” The leading scholar on the subject of Free Will in Antiquity, Michael Frede, observed that "freedom and free will cannot be found in either the Septuagint or the New Testament and must have come to the Christians mainly from Stoicism."

However, McGrath also notes: "The pre-Augustinian theological tradition is practically of one voice in asserting the freedom of the human will. Thus Justin Martyr [c. AD 100- c. AD 165] rejects the idea that all human actions are foreordained on the grounds that this eliminates human accountability."

Oxford Professor Suzanne Bobzien writes that the first evidence of a notion of indeterminist view of free will is found in Alexander of Aphrodisias (ca. 200), and that the Christian, Origen, gleaned his ideas about free will from Alexander.

Early Church Fathers prior to Augustine refuted non-choice predeterminism as being pagan. Out of the fifty early Christian authors who wrote on the debate between free will and determinism, all fifty supported Christian free will against Stoic, Gnostic, and Manichaean determinism and even Augustine taught traditional Christian theology against this determinism for twenty-six years prior to 412 CE. When Augustine started fighting the Pelagians he re-aligned his view with the Gnostic and Manichaean views and taught that humankind has no free will to believe until God infuses grace, which in turn results in saving faith.

In 529, at the Second Council of Orange, the question at hand was whether the doctrines of Augustine on God's providence were to be affirmed, or if Semi-Pelagianism could be affirmed. Semi-Pelagianism was a moderate form of Pelagianism which teaches that the first step of salvation is by human will and not the grace of God. The determination of the Council could be considered "semi-Augustinian". It defined that faith, though a free act of man, resulted, even in its beginnings, from the grace of God, enlightening the human mind and enabling belief. This describes the operation of prevenient grace allowing the unregenerate to repent in faith. On the other hand, the Council of Orange condemned the belief in predestination to evil implied by the Augustinian soteriology.

The early leaders of the Protestant Reformation largely echoed Augustine's later views on free will. There was typically a strong Augustine's influence on John Calvin. On the other hand, the Catholic Council of Trent re-affirmed the Second Council of Orange position against Pelagianism and Semi-Pelagianism. Likewise, the Remonstrants and later Arminians/Wesleyans have been aligned with the Semi-Augustinian position of the canons of the Second Council of Orange concerning free will.

== Notes and references ==
=== Sources ===
- Bonner, Gerald (1999). Bright, Pamela (ed.). Augustine and the Bible. Notre Dame, IN: University of Notre Dame Press.
- Bounds, Christopher. T. (2011). "How are People Saved? The Major Views of Salvation with a Focus on Wesleyan Perspectives and their Implications". Wesley and Methodist Studies. 3: 31–54. doi:10.2307/42909800. JSTOR 42909800.
- Chadwick, Henry (1966). Early Christian Thought and the Classical Tradition. Oxford, UK: Clarendon Press.
- Chadwick, Henry (1983). Tracy, David; Lash, Nicholas (eds.). Cosmology and Theology. Edinburgh: T and T Clark.
- Cross, F. L. (2005). The Oxford dictionary of the Christian church. New York: Oxford University Press.
- Denzinger, Henricus (1954). Enchiridion Symbolorum et Definitionum (30th ed.). Freiburg im Breisgau: Herder.
- Endres, B. J (2012). "The Council of Trent and Original Sin". Proceedings of the Catholic Theological Society of America: 51–91.
- Hanegraaf, Wouter J., ed. (2005). Dictionary of Gnosis and Western Esotericism. Vol. 2. Leiden: Brill.
- James, Frank A. III (1998). Peter Martyr Vermigli and Predestination: The Augustinian Inheritance of an Italian Reformer. Oxford: Clarendon.
- Josephus (1879) [94]. Antiquities of the Jews. London: Ward. Lock & Co., Limited.
- Josephus (1879b) [75]. The War of the Jews, or History of the Destruction of Jerusalem. London: Ward. Lock & Co., Limited.
- Keathley, Kenneth D. (2014). Akin, Dr. Daniel L. (ed.). A Theology for the Church. Nashville: B&H Academic.
- Klawans, Jonathan (2013). Josephus and the Theologies of Ancient Judaism. Oxford: Oxford University Press.
- McGrath, Alister (1998). Iustitia Dei : a history of the Christian doctrine of justification. Cambridge: Cambridge University Press.
- McGrath, Alister (2001). Christian Theology: An Introduction. Cambridge: Blackwell Publishers.
- McIntire, C.T. (2005). Jones, Lindsay (ed.). The Encyclopedia of Religion. Vol. 5 (2 ed.). Farmington Hills, MI: Macmillan Reference USA.
- McKinley, O. Glenn (1965). Where Two Creeds Meet (PDF). Kansas City, MO: Beacon Hill Press of Kansas City.
- Oakley, Francis (1988). The Medieval Experience: Foundations of Western Cultural Singularity. Toronto: University of Toronto Press.
- Olson, Roger E. (2009). Arminian Theology: Myths and Realities. Downers Grove: InterVarsity Press.
- Pickar, C. H. (1981) [1967]. The New Catholic Encyclopedia. Vol. 5. Washington D.C.
- Schaff, Philip (1997). History of the Christian Church. Vol. 3. Oak Harbor, WA: Logos Research Systems.
- Stanglin, Keith D.; McCall, Thomas H. (2012). Jacob Arminius: Theologian of Grace. New York: OUP USA.
- Thorsen, Don (2007). An Exploration of Christian Theology. Grand Rapids: Baker Books.
- Wilson, Kenneth (2018). Augustine's Conversion from Traditional Free Choice to "Non-free Free Will: A Comprehensive Methodology. Tübingen: Mohr Siebeck.
