= Evandro Agazzi =

Italian philosopher (born 1934)

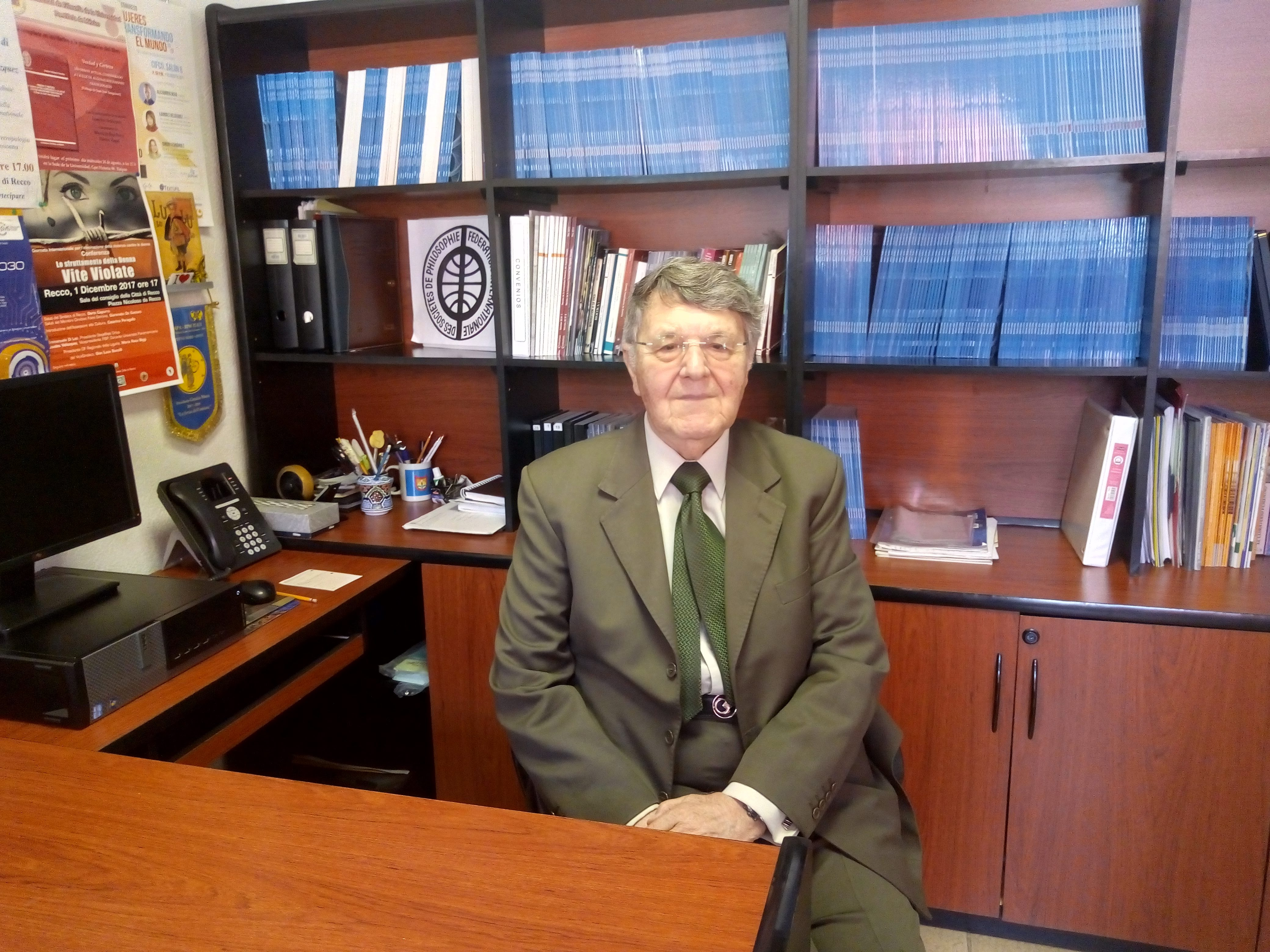
- Evandro Agazzi in his office at Panamerican University
- Born: 23 October 1934 (age 91); Bergamo, Kingdom of Italy

Philosophical work
- Era: Contemporary philosophy
- Region: Western Philosophy
- School: Analytic
- Main interests: Philosophy of science

Evandro Agazzi (born 23 October 1934) is an Italian philosopher and professor at the University of Genoa. His fields of interest are ethics of science and technology, logic, metaphysics, philosophy of language, philosophy of science, philosophical anthropology, and systems theory.

== Education ==
Agazzi is a graduate of the University of Milan, where he studied physics and the Catholic University of Milan where he earned a Ph.D. in philosophy in 1957. Agazzi also did postgraduate work at Oxford and the universities of Marburg and Münster.

== Teaching ==
Agazzi taught mathematics at Genoa, and philosophy of science and mathematical logic at the Catholic University of Milan. He then was named professor of the philosophy of science at Genoa in 1970. He was named chair of philosophical anthropology, philosophy of nature and philosophy of science at the University of Fribourg in 1979. He has served as visiting professor at the University of Düsseldorf, the University of Berne, the University of Pittsburgh, Stanford University, and the University of Geneva as well as other institutions of learning.

== Professional associations ==
Agazzi is currently president of the International Academy of Philosophy of Science, honorary president of the International Federation of Philosophical Societies and of the International Institute of Philosophy. He previously served as president of the Italian Society of Logic and Philosophy of Science, the Italian Philosophical Society, and the Swiss Society of Logic and Philosophy of Science. He served as treasurer of the International Council for Philosophy and Humanities of UNESCO. He also has been a member of the Italian National Committee for Bioethics. He is currently a member of the Editorial Advisory Board of the Journal "Global Philosophy".

== Publications ==
=== Editor ===
==== Journals ====
Agazzi was the editor of Epistemologia, a former Italian journal for the philosophy of science, and of Nuova Secondaria, an Italian journal for high school teachers. He is a consulting editor for several international journals, including Revue Internationale de Philosophie, Zeitschrift für allgemeine Wissenschaftstheorie and Modern Logic.

=== Author ===
==== Journal articles ====
Agazzi has published over seven hundred articles in scholarly journals and essays in volumes of collected works. He is the author of nineteen books, including Philosophie, Science, Métaphysique, Right, Wrong and Science: The Ethical Dimensions of the Techno-Scientific Enterprise

==== Books ====
- Philosophy of Mathematics Today (with György Darvas, 1997)
- Realism and Quantum Physics (1998)
- Advances in the Philosophy of Technology (with Hans Lenk, 1999)
- The Reality of the Unobservable (with Massimo Pauri, 2000)
- Life-Interpretation and the Sense of Illness within the Human Condition: Medicine and Philosophy in a Dialogue (with Anna-Teresa Tymieniecka, 2001)
- The Problem of the Unity of Science (with Jan Faye, 2001)
- Complexity and Emergence (with Luisa Montecucco, 2002)
- Valori e limiti del senso comune (2004)

== Awards and honors ==
- Centro di Studi Filosofici di Gallarate in 1962 for his book Introduzione ai problemi dell’assiomatica
- Cortina-Ulisse in 1983
- Prince of Liechtenstein Prize in 1983 for his book Il bene, il male e la scienza
- International Prize for Philosophy Salento in 2004 for his global work
