= Hanne Andersen (philosopher) =

Danish philosopher of science

- Born: 1964 (age 61–62)

Academic background
- Education: University of Copenhagen
- Alma mater: Roskilde University

Academic work
- Discipline: Philosophy of science
- Institutions: University of Copenhagen; Aarhus University; Royal Danish School of Educational Studies

Hanne Andersen (born 1964) is a Danish philosopher of science. She is a professor of science education at the University of Copenhagen, head of the Department of Science Education, and a member of the research group on history and philosophy of science and science studies.

== Education and career ==
Andersen earned a master's degree in physics and comparative literature at the University of Copenhagen in 1992. After working for two years as a curator at the Danish National Museum for the History of Science and Medicine, she returned to graduate study at Roskilde University, where she completed a Ph.D. in the philosophy of science in 1998.

She became an assistant professor in the Department of Mathematics, Physics, Chemistry and Informatics at the Royal Danish School of Educational Studies (Danmarks Lœrerhøjskole) in 1997, and in 1998 moved to the Department for Medical Philosophy and Clinical Theory at the University of Copenhagen, where she was promoted to associate professor in 2002. She moved again to the Department of Science Studies at Aarhus University in 2005, becoming head of department in 2009 and full professor of physics and astronomy in 2012. She returned to the University of Copenhagen in 2015, in her present position as professor and head of department in the Department of Science Education.

Andersen is a corresponding member of the International Academy of Philosophy of Science.

== Selected publications ==
Andersen is the author or coauthor of:

- On Kuhn (Wadsworth/Thomson Learning, 2001) ISBN 978-0534583569
- The Cognitive Structure of Scientific Revolutions (with Peter Barker and Xiang Chen, Cambridge University Press, 2006)

She is the coeditor of:

- New Challenges to Philosophy of Science (with Dennis Dieks, Wenceslao J. Gonzalez, Thomas Uebel, and Gregory Wheeler, Springer, 2013)
- Empirical Philosophy of Science: Introducing Qualitative Methods into Philosophy of Science (with Susann Wagenknecht and Nancy J. Nersessian, Springer, 2015)

She is also the coauthor, with Brian Hepburn, of the scientific method entry in the Stanford Encyclopedia of Philosophy.
