= Tom Wedberg =

Swedish chess grandmaster (born 1953)

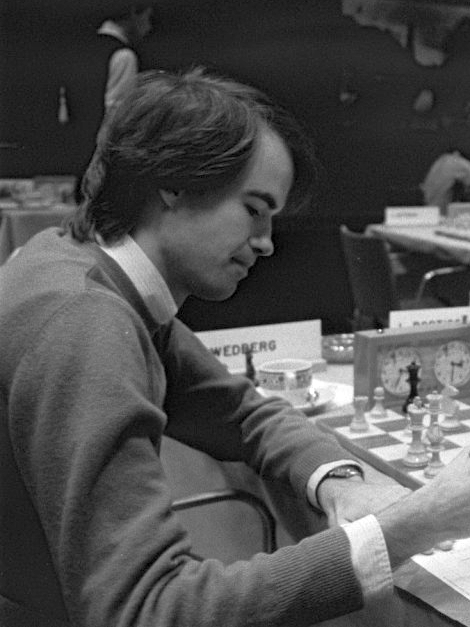
- Tom Wedberg, Amsterdam 1984

Personal information
- Born: 26 November 1953 (age 72) Stockholm, Sweden

Chess career
- Country: Sweden
- Title: Grandmaster (1990)
- Peak rating: 2540 (July 2002)
- Peak ranking: No. 81 (January 1983)

Tom Wedberg (born 26 November 1953) is a Swedish chess grandmaster. He is the son of Swedish philosopher Anders Wedberg.

== Chess career ==
In 2000, he won the Swedish Chess Championship. In 1981 tied for 1st with Petar Velikov and Shaun Taulbut in the Politiken Cup in Copenhagen, but was clear first in 1982. In 1999 he won the Scandic Hotels Chess Cup in Stockholm. He tied for 2nd–4th (with Artur Yusupov and Tomi Nybäck) in the 32nd Rilton Cup in Stockholm 2003.

Wedberg played for Sweden in the Chess Olympiads of 1978, 1980, 1982, 1988, 1990, 1992 and in the European Team Chess Championships of 1980, 1989 and 2001.

According to Chessmetrics, at his peak in September 1984 Wedberg's play was equivalent to a rating of 2630, and he was ranked No. 77 in the world. His best single performance was at Amsterdam (OHRA), 1984, where he scored 4½/8 (56%) against 2665-rated opposition, for a performance rating of 2663.

In the July 2010 FIDE list, he had an Elo rating of 2503, making him the No. 9 ranked Swedish player.

== Notable games ==
- Tom Wedberg vs. Lev Alburt, Lucerne 1982, Alekhine Defense: Alburt Variation (B04), 1−0
- Tom Wedberg vs. Anthony Miles, Oslo 1984, Nimzowitsch Defense: Williams Variation (B00), 1−0
- Eugenio Torre vs. Tom Wedberg, It (open) 1988, Italian Game: Giuoco Pianissimo (C50), 0−1
- Tom Wedberg vs. Viktor Korchnoi, Haninge 1988, French Defense: Steinitz Variation (C14), 1−0
- Tom Wedberg vs. Vasily Smyslov, Haninge 1989, Modern Defense: Pseudo-Austrian Attack (B06), 1−0
