= Verónica Becher =

Argentinian computer scientist

- Education: Universidad de Buenos Aires, University of British Columbia
- Scientific career
- Fields: Computer Science
- Workplaces: Universidad de Buenos Aires
- Thesis: Funciones binarias para el cambio de teorías (1999)
- Doctoral advisor: Carlos Alchourrón

Verónica Becher is an Argentinian computer scientist known for her work in logic and theoretical computer science. She is Full Professor at the University of Buenos Aires and Director of the KAPOW (Knowledgeable Algorithms for Problems on Words) at the Department of Computation.

== Career ==
Becher studied Computer Science at the Universidad de Buenos Aires, graduating in 1990. After that, she obtained an M.Sc. degree in Computer Science from the University of British Columbia under supervision of Craig Boutilier in 1993 and a doctoral degree in Computer Science from the Universidad de Buenos Aires under supervision of Carlos Alchourrón in 1999. She is currently Professor (Profesora Titular) at the Universidad de Buenos Aires and Principal Research at CONICET. She is also associated to the Paris Diderot University via the international associate lab SINFIN (Systèmes, vérIfication, iNformatique Fondamentale, logIque, laNgages or Sistemas, lógIca, leNguajes, Fundamentos de la computacIón, verificacióN), a joint venture of the universities in Paris and Buenos Aires.

Becher as served as a member of the steering committee of the conference series Computability, Complexity, and Randomness (CCR) since 2004, served on the Council of the Association for Symbolic Logic from 2008 to 2010 and from 2014 to 2017, and on the Council of the Division for Logic, Methodology and Philosophy of Science and Technology (DLMPST) from 2016 to 2019. Currently, she is Second Vice President of DLMPST. She was an editor of the Journal of Logic, Language and Information from 2005 to 2009 and is currently an editor of the Journal of Symbolic Logic.
