= Lorenzo Magnani =

Italian philosopher

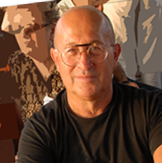
Lorenzo Magnani

Lorenzo Magnani (born 1952) is an Italian philosopher who is a professor of philosophy of science and director of the Computational Philosophy Laboratory at the University of Pavia. In 2006 and 2012 he was a visiting professor at the Sun Yat-sen University in China. In the event of the 50th anniversary of the re-building of the Philosophy Department of Sun Yat-sen University in 2010, an award was given to him to acknowledge his contributions to the areas of philosophy, philosophy of science, logic, and cognitive science.

== Career ==
Magnani's primary research interests are the philosophy of science, logic, cognitive science, artificial intelligence, and philosophy of medicine. His historical research has centered on 19th- and 20th-century geometry and the philosophy of geometry.

He studies the processes of conceptual innovation and change in science also in the perspective of abductive reasoning. His research is to create a working synthesis between epistemological and historical perspectives and investigations of representations and reasoning in cognitive science. He addressed the problem of the relationships between morality and technology and the problem of violence in a philosophical and cognitive perspective.

His previous positions include visiting researcher (Carnegie Mellon University, 1992; McGill University, 1992–93; University of Waterloo, 1993; and the Georgia Institute of Technology, 1995 and 1998–99) and visiting professor (visiting professor of Philosophy of Science and Theories of Ethics at Georgia Institute of Technology, 1999–2003; Weissman Distinguished Visiting professor at Baruch College, City University of New York, 2003). See extended CV

He has directed and directs many international academic programs in collaboration with the US, EU, and China.

Since 1998, initially in collaboration with Nancy J. Nersessian and Paul Thagard, created and promoted the MBR Conferences on Model-Based Reasoning.

A Doctor Honoris Causa degree was awarded to Magnani by the Senate of the Ştefan cel Mare University, Suceava, Romania. The award ceremony took place at the University Campus on March 16, 2012. In 2015 Magnani was appointed member of the International Academy for the Philosophy of the Sciences (AIPS).

== Edited Books in Honor of Lorenzo Magnani ==
- Abductive Minds: Essays in Honor of Lorenzo Magnani - Volume 1 (2025). Edited by Selene Arfini
- Scientific Cognition, Semiotics, and Computational Agents: Essays in Honor of Lorenzo Magnani - Volume 2 (2025). Edited by Selene Arfini

== Books and Edited Books and Proceedings ==
Books

In Italian

- Non-Euclidean Geometries (1978) (anthology of classic texts)
- In Behalf of Architecture (with other co-authors) (1987)
- Applied Epistemology (1991)
- Philosophy and geometry (1991)
- Textbook of Logic: Classical Logic and Logic of Common Sense (co-author R. Gennari) (1997), new edition edited by R. Dossena (2022)
- Introduction to Computational Philosophy (1997)
- Knowledge as a Duty. Distributed Morality in a Technological World (2006)
- Philosophy of Violence (2012), second edition (2022)
- Respecting People as Things (2013)

In English

Monographs

- Abduction, Reason, and Science. Processes of Discovery and Explanation (Kluwer Academic/Plenum Publishers, New York, 2001). Chinese Edition [意] 洛伦佐•玛格纳尼 / 著；李大超，任远 / 译，《溯因、理由与科学——发现和解释的过程》，中国广州：广东人民出版社2006年, 2006;
- Philosophy and Geometry. Theoretical and Historical Issues (Kluwer, Dordrecht, 2001).
- Morality in a Technological World. Knowledge as a Duty (Cambridge University Press, Cambridge, 2007) develops a philosophical and cognitive theory of the relationships between ethics and technology in a naturalistic perspective. The book describes how modern technology has brought about consequences of such magnitude that old policies and ethics can no longer contain them;
- Abductive Cognition. The Epistemological and Eco-Cognitive Dimensions of Hypothetical Reasoning (Springer Science+Business Media, Heidelberg/Berlin, 2009).
- Understanding Violence. The Intertwining of Morality, Religion, and Violence: A Philosophical Stance (Springer Science+Business Media, Heidelberg/Berlin, 2011).
- The Abductive Structure of Scientific Creativity. An Essay on the Ecology of Cognition (Springer Science+Business Media, Cham, Switzerland, 2017).
- Eco-Cognitive Computationalism. Cognitive Domestication of Ignorant Entities (Springer Science+Business Media, Cham, Switzerland, 2022).
- Discoverability. The Urgent Need of an Ecology of Human Creativity (Springer Science+Business Media, Cham, Switzerland, 2022).

Handbooks

- L. Magnani (editor-in-chief) (2023) Handbook of Abductive Cognition, Springer, Cham, Switzerland.
- L. Magnani and T. Bertolotti (eds.) (2017) Springer Handbook of Model-Based Science, Springer, Heidelberg/Berlin.

Edited books and Proceedings

- S. Arfini and L. Magnani (eds.) (2022), Embodied, Extended, Ignorant Minds: New Studies on the Nature of Not-Knowing, Springer, Cham Switzerland, Synthese Books.
- A. Nepomuceno, L. Magnani, F. Salguero, C. Barés and M. Fontaine (eds.) (2019), Model-Based Reasoning in Science and Technology. Inferential Models for Logic, Language, Cognition and Computation, Springer, Cham, Switzerland.
- L. Magnani and C. Casadio (eds.) (2016), Model-Based Reasoning in Science and Technology. Logical, Epistemological, and Cognitive Issues, Springer, Heidelberg/Berlin Series “Sapere”.
- L. Magnani, P. Li, and W. Park (eds.) (2015) Philosophy and Cognitive Science II. Western & Eastern Studies, Series “Sapere", Springer, Heidelberg/Berlin.
- L. Magnani, (ed.) (2013) Model-Based Reasoning in Science and Technology. Theoretical and Cognitive Issues, Series “Sapere", Springer, Heidelberg/Berlin.
- L. Magnani, (ed.) (2013) Introduction to the New Logic, Il Melangolo, Genoa (in Italian).
- L. Magnani and P. Li, (eds.) (2012) Philosophy and Cognitive Science. Western & Eastern Studies, Series “Sapere", Springer, Heidelberg/Berlin.
- L. Magnani, W. Carnielli, C. Pizzi (eds.) (2010) Model-Based Reasoning in Science and Technology. Abduction, Logic, and Computational Discovery, Series “Studies in Computational Intelligence”, Vol. 314, Springer, Heidelberg/Berlin.
- S. Iwata, Y. Oshawa, S. Tsumoto, N. Zhong, Y. Shi, and L. Magnani (eds.) (2008). Communications and Discoveries from Multidisciplinary Data, Series “Studies in Computational Intelligence”, Springer, Berlin/New York.
- L. Magnani and P. Li (eds.) (2007), Model-Based Reasoning in Science, Technology, and Medicine, Series “Studies in Computational Intelligence”, Vol. 64, Springer, Berlin/New York.
- L. Magnani and P. Li (eds.) (2006), Philosophical Investigations from a Perspective of Cognition, Guangdong People's Publishing House, Guangzhou, (published in Chinese: [意] 洛伦佐•玛格纳尼、李平主编，《认知视野中的哲学探究》，中国广州：广东人民出版社2006年).
- L. Magnani (2006) (ed.), Model-Based Reasoning in Science and Engineering. Cognitive Science, Epistemology, Logic, College Publications, London.
- L. Magnani (ed.) (2006), Computing and Philosophy, Associated International Academic Publishers, Pavia.
- L. Magnani and R. Dossena (eds.) (2005), Computing, Philosophy and Cognition, College Publications, London.
- L. Magnani and N. J. Nersessian (eds.) (2002), Model-Based Reasoning. Scientific Discovery, Technological Innovation, Values, Kluwer Academic/Plenum Publishers, New York.
- L. Magnani, N. J. Nersessian, and C. Pizzi (eds.) (2002), Logical and Computational Aspects of Model-Based Reasoning, Kluwer Academic, Dordrecht.
- L. Magnani, N. J. Nersessian, and P. Thagard (eds.) (1999), Model-Based Reasoning in Scientific Discovery, Kluwer Academic/Plenum Publishers, New York, (Chinese edition, translated and edited by Qiming Yu and Tianen Wang, China Science and Technology Press, Beijing, 2001: 《科学发现中的模型化推理》，于祺明、王天思主译，中国北京：中国科学技术出版社2001年),
- L. Magnani and R. Dossena (eds.) (2004), Felix Klein: the Erlangen Program, Pristem/Storia, Springer, Milan (in Italian).

Book series editor
SAPERE - Studies in Applied Philosophy, Epistemology and Rational Ethics, Springer Science+Business Media.

Director
CPL Computational Philosophy Laboratory, University of Pavia, Pavia, Italy.

Complete list of publications in extended CV
See author's web page.

== MBR (Model-Based Reasoning) Conferences ==
Lorenzo Magnani has promoted and chaired the following international conferences:

- MBR 98: Model-based reasoning in Scientific Discovery, with Nancy J. Nersessian and Paul Thagard, in Italy.
- MBR 01: Model-Based Reasoning: Scientific Discovery, Technological innovation, Values, with Nancy J. Nersessian, in Italy.
- E-CAP 2004: European Computing and Philosophy Conference, in Italy.
- MBR 04: Model-Based Reasoning in Science and Engineering, Abduction, Visualization, and Simulation, in Italy.
- MBR 06: Model-Based Reasoning in Science and Medicine, with P. Li, in China.
- MBR 09: Model-Based Reasoning in Science and Technology, with Walter Carnielli, in Brazil.
- MBR 012: Model-Based Reasoning in Science and Technology. Theoretical and Cognitive Issues, in Italy.
- MBR 015: Model-Based Reasoning in Science and Technology. Models and Inferences: Logical, Epistemological, and Cognitive Issues, in Italy.
- MBR 018: Model-Based Reasoning in Science and Technology. Inferential Models for Logic, Language, Cognition and Computation, with Angel Nepomuceno Fernandez and Francisco Salguero Lamillar, 20th Anniversary, In Spain.

He also edited many books (see above) and many special issues of international journals deriving from the international MBR conferences indicated above.
