= Valentin Goranko =

Bulgarian-Swedish logician

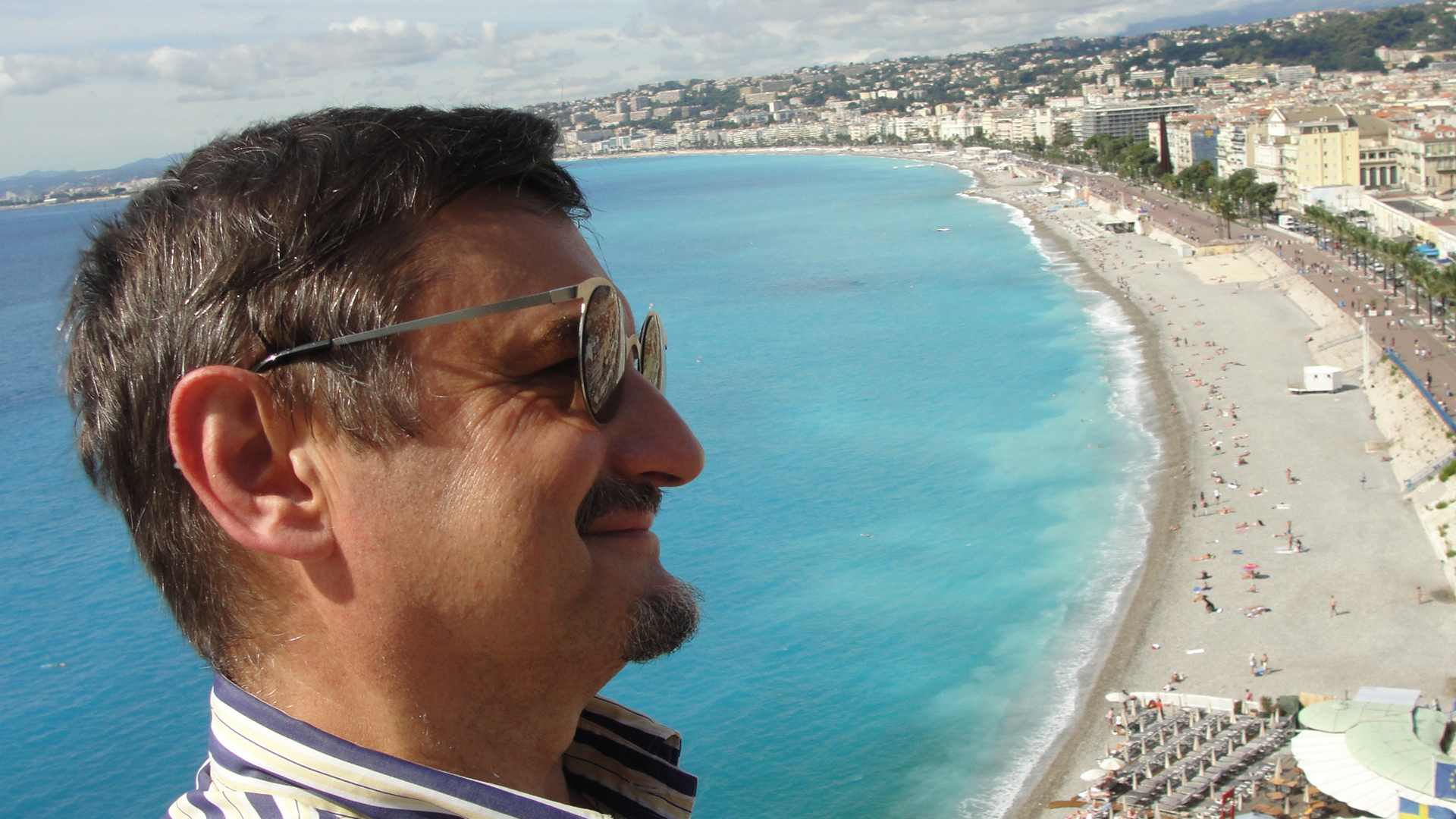
- Valentin Goranko - Nice, Sept 2019
- Born: September 22, 1959 (age 66); Sofia, Bulgaria
- Education: Sofia University
- Known for: contributions to: modal logics, hybrid logics, temporal logics, logics for games and multi-agent systems
- Scientific career
- Fields: Logic
- Thesis: Definability and completeness in multi-modal logics (1988)
- Doctoral advisor: Dimiter Vakarelov

President of the DLMPST/IUHPST
- In office 2024–2027
- Preceded by: Nancy Cartwright
- Website: Official website

Valentin Feodorov Goranko (born 22 September 1959 in Sofia, Bulgaria) is a Bulgarian-Swedish logician, Professor of Logic and Theoretical Philosophy at the Department of Philosophy, Stockholm University. Currently, he is the President of the Division for Logic, Methodology and Philosophy of Science and Technology (DLMPST) of the International Union of History and Philosophy of Science and Technology under the International Science Council (ISC).

== Education and academic career ==
Goranko studied mathematics (M.Sc. 1984) and obtained Ph.D. in Mathematical Logic at the Faculty of Mathematics and Informatics of the Sofia University "St. Kliment Ohridski" in 1988. Before joining Stockholm University in 2014, he has had several academic positions at universities in Bulgaria (until 1992), South Africa (1992-2009), Denmark (2009-2014) and Sweden (since 2014) and has taught a wide variety of courses in Mathematics, Computer Science, and Logic.

== Research fields ==
Goranko has a broad range of research interests in the theory and applications of Logic to artificial intelligence, multi-agent systems, philosophy, computer science, and game theory, where he has published 4 books and over 140 research papers and chapters in handbooks and other research collections.

== Professional service ==
- President (2024–2027) of the Division of Logic, Methodology and Philosophy of Science and Technology (DLMPST) of the International Union of History and Philosophy of Science and Technology (IUHPST)
- President (since 2018) of the Scandinavian Logic Society
- Past president (2016-2020) of the Association for Logic, Language and Information (FoLLI)
- Editor-in-chief (Logic) of the FoLLI Publications series on Logic, Language and Information, a sub-series of Springer LNCS.
- Executive member of the Board of the European Association for Computer Science Logic EACSL
- Editor-in-chief on the journal Logics
- Associate Editor of the ACM Transactions on Computational Logic and member of the editorial boards of several other scientific journals.

== Published books ==
- 2015 Logic and Discrete Mathematics: A Concise Introduction
- 2016 Temporal Logics in Computer Science
- 2016 Logic as a Tool: A Guide to Formal Logical Reasoning
- 2023 Temporal logics

Academic offices
Preceded by Nancy Cartwright	President of the Division for Logic, Methodology and Philosophy of Science and Technology of the International Union for History and Philosophy of Science and Technology (DLMPST/IUHPST); 2024–2027	Succeeded by incumbent
