= René Taton =

French mathematician and historian of science (1915–2004)

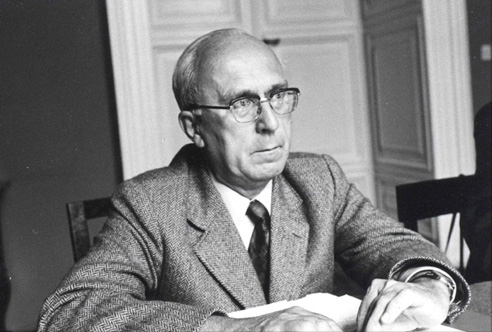
The French mathematician and historian of science René Taton (1915–2004)

René Taton (4 April 1915 – 9 August 2004) was a French mathematician, historian of science, and long co-chief-editor of the Revue d'histoire des sciences. He was awarded both the highest lifetime achievement awards in the field of history of science: the George Sarton Medal, in 1975, and the Alexandre Koyré Medal, in 1997.

== Life ==
Taton was born on 4 April 1915 in L'Échelle, France. In 1935, he became a student of École normale supérieure de Saint-Cloud. He was a mathematician before moving to the history of science, and in 1951 cemented the move by earning a doctorat d'état ès lettres with philosopher Gaston Bachelard as his advisor, focusing on the history of projective geometry; his primary thesis concerned the work of Gaspard Monge and his accessory thesis concerned Girard Desargues.

He died on 9 August 2004 in Ajaccio, Corsica, France.

== Career ==
Taton was an early participant in Alexandre Koyré's Centre de Recherches en Histoire des Sciences et des Techniques of the Ecole des Hautes Etudes en Sciences Sociales in Paris. He became assistant director in 1958 (when Koyré joined Princeton's Institute for Advanced Study) and then full director after Koyré's death in 1964; the Centre was renamed the Centre Alexandre Koyré in 1966. Taton retired in 1983, but continued to work.

He was known for being one of the first chief editors, with Suzanne Delorme, of the Revue d’histoire des sciences (Journal of history of science). He led the collective effort to write a Histoire generalé des sciences (English: General History of Science (last edition in 1996, PUF, Quadriga); also translated into Arabic, Italian, Portuguese, and Spanish), a major reference in the field of history of science. Taton became the first secretary general of the Division of History of Science of the International Union of History and Philosophy of Science and served as its president (1975–1978).

He was awarded the 1975 George Sarton Medal for lifetime achievement in the history of science, the Koyré Medal in 1997, and the 1997 Kenneth O. May Prize in the history of mathematics.

== Works ==
- To continue the calculus (collection of Abbot Moreux), 1945?
- History of computing, coll. "What do I know? "1946
- Mental arithmetic, Presses Universitaires de France, coll. "What do I know? " n o 605, Paris. First edition: 1953, 128 p., (notice BnF n o FRBNF326561651 ) . Last Edit: 1979, 126 p., ( ISBN 2-13-035802-0 ), (notice BnF n o FRBNF34655169f ) .
- Casualties and accidents of scientific discovery: illustration of some characteristic stages of the evolution of science, published by Masson et al. "Evolution Science" n o 6, Paris, 1955, 172 p., (notice BnF n o FRBNF32656167q ) .
- General History of Science (1957 to 1964), reissue (1966-1983).
- Historical Studies of Science (collected his 85 th birthday by Danielle Fauque Myriana Ilic and Robert Halleux), Brepols Publishing, coll. "From diversis artibus" n o 47, Turnhout, 2000, 544 p., ( ISBN 2-503-51007-8 ), (notice BnF n o FRBNF37734558t ) .
- Later writings, 2000, compiled by R. Halleux
