= Epistemologia =

Defunct academic journal of philosophy

- Discipline: Philosophy
- Language: English, Italian
- Edited by: Evandro Agazzi

Publication details
- History: 1978–2016
- Publisher: Tilgher-Genova (Italy)
- Frequency: Biannual

Standard abbreviations
- ISO 4: Epistemologia

Indexing
- ISSN: 0392-9760

Epistemologia was a biannual peer-reviewed academic journal of philosophy. It was focused on analytical philosophy, publishing articles that deal with philosophy of science, epistemology, logic, philosophy of language, and philosophy of mind. It published articles in English and Italian. In 2015, it was reported that the journal had been hijacked.

Since 2016, Epistemologia is no longer published as a separate publication, becoming an annual English-language supplement to the journal Axiomathes.

== See also ==
- Agalma
- List of philosophy journals
