= Susanne Bobzien =

German-born British philosopher (born 1960)

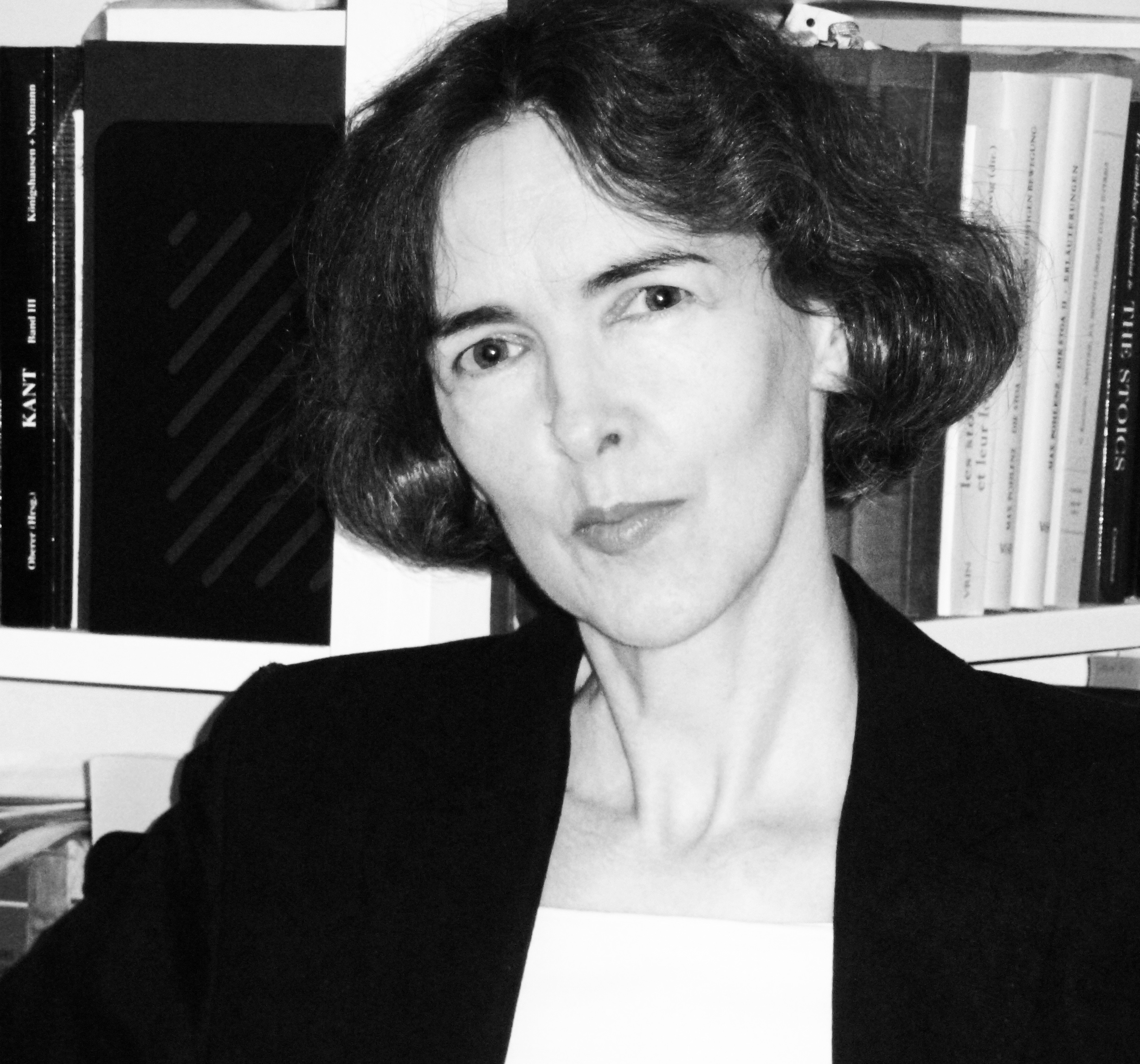
Susanne Bobzien in 2012

Susanne Bobzien FBA (born 1960) is a German-born philosopher whose research interests focus on philosophy of logic and language, determinism and freedom, and ancient philosophy. She is currently a visiting research fellow at Princeton University and professor emerita and a quondam fellow at Oxford University and All Souls College, Oxford.

== Early life ==
Bobzien was born in Hamburg, West Germany, in 1960. She graduated in 1985 with an M.A. at Bonn University, and in 1993 with a doctorate in philosophy (D.Phil.) at Oxford University, where from 1987 to 1989 she was affiliated with Somerville College.

== Academic career ==
Bobzien was a tutorial fellow in philosophy at Balliol College, Oxford from 1989 to 1990, fellow and praelector in philosophy at The Queen's College, Oxford from 1990 to 2002, and CUF Lecturer in Philosophy at Oxford University from 1993 to 2002. She was appointed to a senior professorship in philosophy at Yale in 2001 and held this position from 2002 to 2010. From 2013 to 2023, she was Professor of Philosophy and Senior Research Fellow at All Souls College, Oxford. In the fall of 2023 she resigned her fellowship and returned to the US for family reasons, where in 2024 she took up a visiting professorship at Princeton University. Since 2025, she has been a visiting research fellow in the Department of Philosophy at Princeton University.

Among her awards are a British Academy Research Readership (2000–2002), and a fellowship of the National Endowment for the Humanities (2008–09). In 2014 she was elected a Fellow of the British Academy, the United Kingdom's national academy for the humanities and social sciences. In 2021, she was elected a corresponding member of the International Academy of Philosophy of Science. Bobzien has published several books and numerous articles in leading academic journals and collections.

== Philosophical work ==
=== Determinism and freedom ===
Bobzien's major work Determinism and Freedom in Stoic Philosophy is "the first full-scale modern study of the [Stoic] theory [of determinism]". "It explores ... the views of the Stoics on causality, fate, the modalities, divination, rational agency, the non-futility of action, moral responsibility, [and the] formation of character". In this book and in her articles "The Inadvertent Conception and Late Birth of the Free-Will Problem" and "Did Epicurus discover the Free-Will Problem?" Bobzien argues that the problem of determinism and free-will, as conceived in contemporary philosophy, was not considered by Aristotle, Epicurus or the Stoics, as was previously thought, but only in the 2nd century CE, as the result of a conflation of Stoic and Aristotelian theory.

Bobzien's "Die Kategorien der Freiheit bei Kant" (The Categories of Freedom in Kant) has been described as an article "that has long been the starting point for any German reader seeking to deepen his understanding of the second chapter of the Analytic of Kant's Critique of Practical Reason." It differentiates the main functions of Kant's Categories of Freedom: as conditions of the possibility for actions (i) to be free, (ii) to be comprehensible as free and (iii) to be morally evaluated.

=== History of logic ===
Bobzien's Die stoische Modallogik is the first monograph on Stoic modal logic. In her paper "Stoic Syllogistic" Bobzien sets out the evidence for Stoic syllogistic. She argues that this should not be assimilated into standard propositional calculus, but treated as a distinct system which bears important similarities to relevance logic and connexive logic. In "Stoic Sequent Logic and Proof Theory", she argues that stoic deduction resembles backward proof search for Gentzen-style substructural sequent logics as developed in structural proof theory, and in the co-authored "Stoic Logic and Multiple Generality" she lays out evidence that Stoic logic could handle the problem of multiple generality in a variable-free first-order logic.

Bobzien's paper "The Development of Modus Ponens in Antiquity" traces the earliest development of modus ponens (or Law of Detachment). She has also reconstructed the ancient history of hypothetical syllogisms and Galen's representation of peripatetic hypothetical syllogistic, and shown these differ from stoic syllogistic and contemporary propositional logic.

In the 2021 extended essay "Frege plagiarized the Stoics", based on her 2016 Keeling Lecture, Bobzien argues in detail that Frege plagiarized them on a large scale in his work on the philosophy of logic and language, written mainly between 1890 and his death in 1925.

=== Vagueness and paradoxes ===
Bobzien has worked on the philosophical application of the modal logic S4.1 to vagueness and paradoxes. She has introduced and developed the philosophical ideas of columnar higher-order vagueness, borderline nestings, and semi-determinability.

In "Gestalt Shifts in the Liar", presented in her 2017 Jacobsen Lecture, Bobzien analyses three features of liar sentences and shows how their combination leads to the liar's paradoxicality: salience-based bistability, context sensitivity, and assessment sensitivity. On this basis she proposes the modal logic S4.1 as governing the truth operator and offers a revenge-free solution to the liar paradox that relates to Herzberger's revision theory of truth.

Bobzien has proposed a logic of higher-order vagueness (the quantified modal logic S4.1 supplemented with Max Cresswell's Finality Axiom) that delivers a generic solution to the Sorites paradox and avoids higher-order vagueness paradoxes and sharp boundaries. The proposed logic is weaker than classical logic and stronger than intuitionistic logic. It is a modal companion to the superintuitionistic logic QH+KF.

== Selected publications ==
Determinism and freedom

- Determinism and Freedom in Stoic Philosophy (Oxford 1998). ISBN 0199247676
- Freedom, and Moral Responsibility: Essays in Ancient Philosophy (Oxford 2021). ISBN 0198866739
- "The Inadvertent Conception and Late Birth of the Free-Will Problem" (Phronesis 43, 1998)
- "Did Epicurus Discover the Free-Will Problem?" (Oxford Studies in Ancient Philosophy 19, 2000)
- "Die Kategorien der Freiheit bei Kant" (in Kant: Analysen-Probleme-Kritik vol. 1, Würzburg, 1988)

History of logic

- Die stoische Modallogik (Würzburg 1986). ISBN 3884792849
- Alexander of Aphrodisias: On Aristotle Prior Analytics 1.1-7, with J. Barnes, K. Flannery, K. Ierodiakonou (London 1991). ISBN 0715623478
- "Stoic Syllogistic" (Oxford Studies in Ancient Philosophy 14, 1996). ISBN 0198236700
- "The Development of Modus Ponens in Antiquity" (Phronesis 47, 2002)
- "Stoic Sequent Logic and Proof Theory" (History and Philosophy of Logic 40, 2019)
- "Stoic Logic and Multiple Generality", with Simon Shogry (Philosophers' Imprint 20, 2020)
- "Frege Plagiarized the Stoics" (in Themes in Plato, Aristotle, and Hellenistic Philosophy: Keeling Lectures 2011-18, London 2021)

Vagueness and paradoxes

- "Higher-order Vagueness, Radical Unclarity, and Absolute Agnosticism" (Philosophers' Imprint 10, 2010)
- "In Defense of True Higher-Order Vagueness" (Synthese 180, 2011)
- "If it's Clear, then it's Clear that it's Clear, or is it? – Higher-Order Vagueness and the S4 Axiom" (Oxford 2012)
- "Higher-Order Vagueness and Borderline Nestings – a Persistent Confusion" (Analytic Philosophy 54.1, 2013).
- "Columnar Higher-order Vagueness or Vagueness is Higher-Order Vagueness" (Aristotelian Society Suppl. 89, 2015)
- "Gestalt Shifts in the Liar or Why KT4M is the Logic of Semantic Modalities" (in Reflections on the Liar, Oxford 2017)
- "Intuitionism and the Modal Logic of Vagueness", with Ian Rumfitt (Journal of Philosophical Logic 49, 2020)
- "A Generic Solution to the Sorites Paradox" (Erkenntnis, 2024)

== See also ==
- Free will in antiquity#Epicureanism
- Stoic logic
- Stoicism
