= Anders Wedberg =

Swedish philosopher

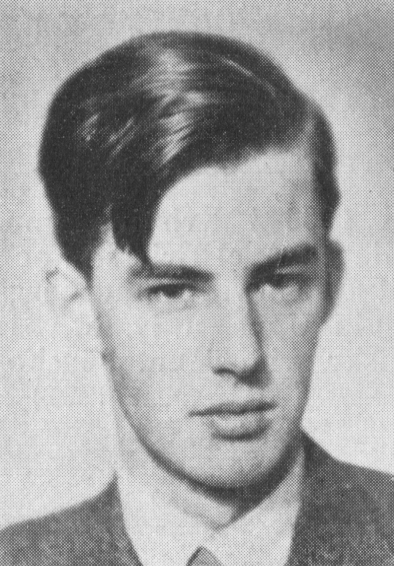
Image of Anders Wedberg

Anders Wedberg (March 30, 1913 – February 20, 1978) was a Swedish philosopher.

Wedberg was born in Stockholm. His father was the prominent lawyer and member of the Swedish Academy Birger Wedberg. Anders was the father of chess player Tom Wedberg.

Wedberg studied at Uppsala University under Axel Hägerström, among others. In 1949 he became the first full professor of theoretical philosophy at Stockholm University, and he remained there until his retirement in 1975. From 1939 to 1943 he studied at Princeton and Harvard and taught at Cornell.

His most illustrious theoretical work was the book Plato's Philosophy of Mathematics from 1955. His most known work, however, is his three-volume work on the history of philosophy Filosofins historia, which appeared between 1958 and 1966. This work was translated into English and was published by Oxford University Press in 1982 to 1984. His approach in these volumes was new (at least in Sweden), in that it attempted to interpret and analyze past philosophers using the plethora of analytic methods available to modern philosophers. Through his work and his teaching, Wedberg contributed to a reorientation of Swedish philosophy in the direction of more analytic rigor.

He translated from German Hans Kelsen's General Theory of Law and State (1945).
