= Charlotte Werndl =

Austrian philosopher

- Awards: Cushing Memorial Prize in History and Philosophy of Physics

Education
- Education: University of Cambridge (PhD)
- Thesis: Philosophical aspects of chaos: definitions in mathematics, unpredictability, and the observational equivalence of deterministic and indeterministic descriptions (2010)
- Doctoral advisor: Jeremy Butterfield

Philosophical work
- Era: 21st-century philosophy
- Region: Western philosophy
- Institutions: University of Salzburg
- Main interests: philosophy of science
- Website: http://charlottewerndl.net/index.html

Charlotte Werndl is an Austrian philosopher. She holds a chair in logic and philosophy of science at the University of Salzburg and a visiting professorship at the London School of Economics. Werndl is known for her works on philosophy of science and is a winner of Cushing Memorial Prize in History and Philosophy of Physics (2011).

== Career ==
Werndl received her doctoral degree from the University of Cambridge. Before teaching at the University of Salzburg, she was an associate professor at the London School of Economics. Previously, she was a junior research fellow at the Queen's College, University of Oxford.

She is an editor of the Review of Symbolic Logic and an associate editor of Philosophy of Science. She is also a member of the council of the DLMPST (International Union of History and Philosophy of Science).

In 2021, she was elected member of the Academia Europaea.

== See also ==
- Chaos theory
- Determinism
