= Robert Sharples (classicist) =

British classical philologist (1949–2010)

- Born: 28 May 1949; Beckenham, London
- Died: 11 August 2010 (aged 61); Northwood, London
- Other name: Bob Sharples

Academic work
- Main interests: Natural philosophy; the Peripatetic school

Professor Robert William (Bob) Sharples (28 May 1949 – 11 August 2010) was a British educator and authority on ancient Greek philosophy. He was a member of the department of Greek and Latin at University College London for over 30 years, and won international distinction for his work in ancient philosophy, especially physics (or "natural philosophy") and in the Peripatetic tradition after Aristotle. His pioneering interest in previously under-studied figures such as Alexander of Aphrodisias led the way in the field.

== Life and work ==
Sharples was educated at Dulwich College and Trinity College, Cambridge, from which he gained a first-class degree in 1970. He became a research fellow at Fitzwilliam College, Cambridge in 1972, and from 1973 until his retirement he was at University College London. Awarded the Ph.D. degree in 1978 ("Studies in the De Fato of Alexander of Aphrodisias"), he was lecturer, then Reader (1990) and shortly after Professor of Classics (1994). He was also a part-time tutor for the Open University for many years.

Sharples regularly collaborated with the Philosophy department in running the Keeling Lectures and colloquia, and in publishing their papers. He was a member of Project Theophrastus, directed by William Fortenbaugh, of Rutgers University, with special responsibility for material in physics and biology. Other collaborations included his analysis of Aristotle, Metaphysics Lambda, for the Archelogos project, and the decipherment of the commentary on Aristotle's Categories, fragments of which are preserved in the Archimedes palimpsest. Throughout his career, he was a prolific author, writing many books and editing collections, and publishing over 100 articles.

Following a period of declining health, he died one year after retirement and his funeral took place at Holy Trinity, Northwood, where he had been an active member of the church. The Department of Greek and Latin at UCL created a postgraduate studentship fund to honour his memory.
