= Jan Faye =

Danish philosopher of science and metaphysics

Jan Faye is a Danish philosopher of science and metaphysics. He is currently associate professor in philosophy at the University of Copenhagen. Faye has contributed to a number of areas in philosophy including explanation, interpretation, philosophy of the humanities and the natural sciences, evolutionary naturalism, philosophy of Niels Bohr, and topics concerning time, causation, and backward causation (Retrocausality).

== Early life ==
He is educated in philosophy and physics at the University of Copenhagen, was a Research Fellow under the Carlsberg Foundation, a Visiting Fellow at the University of Pittsburgh, USA, and held a postdoc at the University of Cambridge, England. He has taught philosophy at the University of Copenhagen, Denmark since 1995.

== Research ==
=== Metaphysics ===
In the area of metaphysics Faye defends the possibility of backward causation in his book The reality of the future (1989). Faye argues that the direction of causation can in principle be reversed with respect to time and that if something like backward causation were physically possible, then it would involve causal processes carrying negative energy forward in time. Also within metaphysics, in his Experience and Beyond (2016), Faye strongly rejects realism about abstract objects by claiming that humans are not adapted by natural selection to grasp real abstract entities. In contrast, he holds that we need to invent abstract concepts in order to be able to talk, say, about identity over time.

=== Philosophy of science ===
In his book Niels Bohr: His Heritage and Legacy (1991) and in several edited volumes dedicated to Bohr’s interpretation of quantum mechanics, Faye has contributed to the understanding of Bohr's philosophical interpretation of quantum mechanics. Faye originally called Bohr an objective anti-realist because he sees Bohr’s interpretation as a case of anti-realism with respect to the theory of quantum mechanics, but not with respect to atomic entities. But where Bohr rejected representationalism with respect to the quantum formalism and regarded quantum theory as a tool for prediction, Faye has later advocated the view according to which the basic laws of nature properly understood are explicit language rules. However, parts of the pragmatism and naturalism that form the back-bone of Faye’s own philosophy may be traced back to his understanding of Bohr.

In Rethinking Science (2002), After Postmodernism (2012), and The Nature of Scientific Thinking (2014), Faye variously promotes the methodological unity among the natural sciences, the humanities, and the social sciences. Faye defends this claim by developing a general pragmatic-rhetorical theory of explanation that attempts to cover all kinds of explanations in the sciences and the humanities.

=== Philosophy of mind ===
Within the philosophy of mind, Faye has explored how we can understand consciousness from the evolutionary-naturalistic program he also pursues in his work on metaphysics. His thesis is that the properties of consciousness must be understood as extrinsic properties that arise from the organism's neural system constantly interacting with its surroundings. This is in contrast to traditional materialistic explanations of consciousness that have sought to understand consciousness by referring to intrinsic properties of the brain.

== Published books (In English) ==
- The reality of the future. An essay on time, causation and backward causation. Odense University Press, Odense 1989, 320 pp. ISBN 87-7492-710-8
- Niels Bohr: His Heritage and Legacy. An anti-realist view of quantum mechanics. Series: Science and Philosophy, vol. 6. Kluwer academic publishers, Dordrecht/Boston/London 1991, i-xxii + 263 pp. ISBN 0-7923-1294-5 Book reviews:
- Rethinking Science. A Philosophical Introduction to the Unity of Science. Ashgate. Aldershot/Burlington/Singapore/Sidney 2002. i-viii + 219 pp. (An enlarged version of Athenes Kammer). ISBN 0-7546-0660-0
- After postmodernism. A naturalistic reconstruction of the humanities. London: Palgrave Macmillan 2012, 224 pp. ISBN 978-0-230-34856-1
- The Nature of Scientific Thinking. On Interpretation, Explanation, and Understanding. London: Palgrave Macmillan 2014, xiv + 333 pp. ISBN 978-1-137-38982-4
- Experience and Beyond. The Outline of a Darwinian Metaphysics. London: Palgrave-Macmillan, 2016. xiv + 342 pages. ISBN 978-3-319-31076-3
- How Matter Becomes Conscious: A Naturalistic Theory of the Mind. London: Palgrave-Macmillan, 2019. 329 pages. ISBN 978-3030161378

== Edited books (In English) ==
- with Henry Folse (eds.): Niels Bohr and Contemporary Philosophy. Preface and Introduction by Jan Faye og Henry Folse. Series: Boston Studies in the Philosophy of Science, vol. 153. Kluwer Academic Publishers, Dordrecht/Boston/London 1994. i-xxvii + 377 pp. ISBN 0-7923-2378-5
- with Uwe Scheffler and Max Urchs (eds.): Logic and Causal Reasoning. Preface and Introduction by J. Faye, U. Scheffler & M. Urchs (s. 1-25). Akademie Verlag, Berlin 1994. i-ix + 287 pp. ISBN 3-05-002599-9
- with Uwe Scheffler and Max Urchs (eds.): Perspectives on Time. Preface and Introduction by J. Faye, U. Scheffler & M. Urchs (s. 1-58). Series: Boston Studies in the Philosophy of Science, vol 189. Kluwer Academic Publishers, Dordrecht/Boston/-London 1997, 460 pp.mISBN 0-7923-4330-1
- with Henry Folse (eds.): Causality and Complementary. Niels Bohr's Philosophical Writings, Volume 4. Preface and Introduction by Jan Faye og Henry Folse (vii, pp. 1–23). Ox Bow Press 1999. 191 pp. ISBN 1-881987-14-0
- with Uwe Scheffler and Max Urchs (eds.): Things, Facts and Events. Preface and Introduction by Jan Faye, Uwe Scheffler & Max Urchs (pp. 1–64). Series: Poznan Studies in the Philosophy of the Sciences and the Humanities, vol. 76, Rodopi, Amsterdam/Atlanta 2000. 506 pp. ISBN 90-420-1533-0
- with Evandro Agazzi (eds.): The Problems of the Unity of Science. Introduction by Evandro Agazzi og Jan Faye (pp. v-xiii) World Scientific Publishing Co. New Jersey/London/Singapore/Hong Kong 2001. 194 pp. ISBN 981-02-4791-5
- with Paul Needham, Uwe Scheffler & Max Urchs (eds.): Nature's Principles. Preface and Introduction by Jan Faye, Paul Needham, Uwe Scheffler og Max Urchs. (s. 1-53). Series: Logic, Epistemology and the Unity of Science, vol. 4. Springer. Dordrecht 2005. 292 pp. ISBN 1-4020-3257-9
- with Henry Folse (eds.): Niels Bohr and Philosophy of Physics. Twenty First Century Perspectives. London: Bloomsbury 2017. ISBN 978-1-350-03511-9
