= Liu Dun =

Chinese official serving warlord Sun Quan (193–228)

- 劉惇

Military Adviser (軍師)
- Monarch: Sun Quan
- Governor: Sun Fu

Personal details
- Occupation: Official
- Courtesy name: Ziren (子仁)

Liu Dun (fl. 190s – 220s), courtesy name Ziren, was an official serving under the warlord Sun Quan during the late Eastern Han dynasty and early Three Kingdoms period of China, an expert at divination who was secretive in his arts.

== Life ==
Liu Dun's ancestral home was Pingyuan (平原). During the chaos of the end of the Han dynasty, he fled across the Yangzi to Luling (廬陵) where he was invited to the staff of its administrator Sun Fu, cousin and general to the warlord Sun Quan. Liu Dun was skilled in divination with an expertise in astrology, he became famed in the south for it, predicting floods, droughts and uprisings. Sun Fu was impressed by Liu Dun's predictions, using him to help find the hiding places of local rebels and appointed him as his Military Advisor (軍師 junshi), while among the army itself he became popularly known by the nickname Shenming (神明 "Divine Brilliance").

Liu Dun later served under Sun Quan directly. In 204, Sun Quan was at Yuzhang, having remained there on his return from a campaign against Huang Zu the year before and became worried by a change in stars. Liu Dun warned there would be trouble in Danyang, a betrayal which was deemed to be foreseeing the assassination of Sun Quan's younger brother Sun Yi, the Administrator of Danyang (丹楊郡), by Bian Hong (邊鴻).

Liu Dun was also the author of a now-lost tome of his art in a hundred volumes, which was praised by the scholar Diao Xuan (刁玄). However, Liu Dun was also noted for being secretive of his arts and declining to share it with others, resulting in his work becoming increasingly difficult for subsequent generations to understand.

== See also ==
- Lists of people of the Three Kingdoms
