= Gregory J. Feist =

American personality psychologist

Gregory John Feist
- Born: December 23, 1961 (age 64); Lawrence, Kansas, U.S.
- Education: University of Massachusetts, Amherst (BA); University of California, Berkeley (PhD)
- Scientific career
- Fields: Psychology
- Workplaces: College of William & Mary; San Jose State University
- Thesis: The psychology of science: Personality, cognitive, motivational and working styles of eminent and less eminent scientists (University of California, Berkeley) (1991)
- Doctoral advisor: Gerald Mendelsohn, Philip Tetlock

Gregory John Feist (born December 23, 1961) is an American psychologist and Professor of Psychology at San Jose State University. He has published in the psychology of creativity, personality, motivated reasoning, the psychology of science, and the development of scientific talent. His recent research has focused on the psychology of climate change. He is on the board of the Western Psychological Association as a past president. He is also a member of the Climate Innovation Coalition.

== Early life and education ==
Gregory J. Feist was born in Lawrence, Kansas. His father Jesse J. Feist, was a professor of psychology and education at McNeese State University in Lake Charles, LA, where Feist grew up.

Feist earned a B.A. in psychology from the University of Massachusetts, Amherst in 1985. He received his PhD at the University of California, Berkeley in 1991. His senior honors thesis under Seymour Epstein, on the relationship between self- and other-perception in children, was published in the Journal of Personality and Social Psychology.

== Career ==
From 1991 to 1995, Feist was an assistant professor at San Jose State University. From 1995 to 2002, he was an assistant and associate professor of psychology at the College of William & Mary. He was on the faculty at the University of California, Davis from 2002 to 2006. Since 2006, Feist has been on the faculty at San Jose State University, where he is a full professor of psychology.

== Research contributions ==
=== Psychology of creativity ===
Feist has extended the work conducted on the personality influences of creative achievement. He was the first to publish a quantitative meta-analysis of the literature on personality and creativity in the arts and sciences. With Frank Barron, Feist conducted a 44-year follow up of Berkeley graduate students, most of whom went on to have careers in the sciences. They found that personality predicted lifetime creative achievement over and above intellect and potential. In 2019, Feist published a functional theory of creativity that argues that having personality traits of high in openness to experience, introversion, self-confidence functions to lower the threshold for creative thought and achievement. He has applied evolutionary theory and sexual selection pressures to explain why people find artistic creativity a sexually attractive trait. Along with Daniel Dostal and Victor Kwan, Feist conducted an extensive analysis of the lifetime incidence of nearly 20 different forms of mental illness in creative artists, writers, musicians, and scientists and found elevated rates of affective disorder and chemical dependency in artists compared to norms, athletes, and creative scientists.

=== Psychology of science ===
Beginning with his dissertation in 1991, Feist has been a leading figure in the fledging field of the psychology of science. The first major paper from the dissertation research was published in 1993 and its main findings revealed that observer rated hostility, arrogant working style, and intrinsic motivation were the major influences on scientific productivity and eminence. Collaborating with Michael Gorman, Feist published a systematic review of the scientific literature on the psychology of science.

In 2006, Feist published the Psychology of Science and the Origins of the Scientific Mind. He then helped found the International Society for the Psychology of Science & Technology as well as becoming founding Editor-in-Chief of the Journal of Psychology of Science & Technology.

Feist has investigated the development of scientific talent in winners of the Science Talent Search as well as members of the National Academy of Sciences. Feist found that lifetime scientific achievement was predicted by early expression of talent, early scientific productivity, gender, and immigrant status.

Dr. Feist is also the author of many college textbooks including Theories of Personality, and Psychology: Perspectives and Connections, now in its 6th edition.

== Selected publications ==
=== Academic books ===
- Feist, G.J. (2006). The Psychology of Science and the Origins of the Scientific Mind. New Haven, CT: Yale University Press. ISBN 9780300143270
- Feist, G.J. & Gorman, M.E. (Editors) (2013). Handbook of the Psychology of Science. New York: Springer Publishing. ISBN 9780826106247
- Feist, G.J., Reiter-Palmon, R., & Kaufman, J.C. (Editors) (2017). Cambridge Handbook of Creativity and Personality Research. New York, NY: Cambridge University Press. ISBN 9781316228036

=== Textbooks ===
- Feist, G.J., & Rosenberg, E.L. (2019). Fundamentals of Psychology: Perspectives & Connections. Boston: McGraw-Hill. ISBN 9781260500226
- Feist, G.J. Roberts, T.A., Feist, J. (2021). Theories of Personality (10th edition). McGraw-Hill [translated into Chinese, and Spanish & Tagalog] ISBN 9781260175769
- Feist, G.J., & Rosenberg, E.L. (2022). Psychology: Perspectives & Connections (5th edition). Boston: McGraw-Hill. ISBN 9781264108060

== Selected awards ==
- Winner, 2007 William James Book Award, Division 1 General Psychology, American Psychological Association, for The Psychology of Science and the Origins of the Scientific Mind
- Berlyne Award 2000, Division 10, American Psychological Association
