= Psychology of science =

Study of scientific thought or behavior

The psychology of science is a branch of the studies of social science defined most simply as the study of scientific thought or behavior. It is a collection of studies of various topics. The thought of psychology has been around since the late 19th century. Research on the psychology of science began in 1874, the field has seen a substantial expansion of activity in recent years. The specific field of psychology as a science first gained popularity mostly in the 1960s, with Abraham Maslow publishing an influential text on the subject (Maslow, 1966), but this popularity faded, only re-emerging in the 1980s (e.g., Simonton, 1988). Other studies of science include philosophy of science, history of science, and sociology of science or sociology of scientific knowledge.

The psychology of science applies methods and theory from psychology to the analysis of scientific thought and behavior, each of which is defined both narrowly and broadly. Narrowly defined, "science" refers to thought and behavior of scientists and technologists. More broadly defined, "science" refers to thought and behavior of anyone (past and present) of any age engaged in problem finding and problem solving, scientific theory construction, learning scientific or mathematical concepts, scientific modelling, testing plausible rival hypotheses, or other scientific reasoning. The methods of psychology that are applied to the study of scientific thought and behavior include: psychohistorical, psychobiographical, observational, descriptive, correlational, and experimental techniques (e.g., Gholson et al., 1989; Giere, 1992; Kowlowski, 1996; Magnani et al., 1999; Carruthers et al., 2002; Feist, 2006; Proctor & Capaldi, 2012; Feist & Gorman, 2013).

The psychology of science includes research in many subfields of psychology, such as but not limited to neuroscientific, developmental, educational, cognitive, personality, social, and clinical (Feist, 2011). A recent branch of psychology of science investigates attitudes towards science and science skepticism (e.g. Rutjens, Heine et al., 2018; Rutjens, Sutton et al., 2018). Gregory Feist's 2006 book The Psychology of Science and the Origins of the Scientific Mind (Feist, 2006), and the 2013 edited book Handbook of the Psychology of Science (Feist & Gorman, 2013) review and integrate many sub-disciplines of psychology.

== See also ==
- Gaston Bachelard § Bachelard's psychology of science
- Psychology of art
- Science education
- Outline of psychology
- Psychology of Science Lab

== Bibliography ==
- Campbell, D.T. (1988). Epistemology and methodology for social science. Chicago: Chicago University Press. ISBN 0-226-09248-8
- Clement, J.J. (2008). Creative model construction in scientists and students: the role of imagery, analogy, and mental stimulation. New York: Springer. ISBN 9781402067112, doi:10.1007/978-1-4020-6712-9
- Carruthers, P., Stich, S.P., & Siegal, M. (Eds.) (2002). The cognitive basis of science. Cambridge, UK; New York: Cambridge University Press. ISBN 0521812291, doi:10.1017/CBO9780511613517
- Dunbar, K. (2002). Understanding the role of cognition in science: The Science as Category framework. In In P. Carruthers, S. Stich, & M. Siegal (Eds.). The cognitive basis of science (pp. 154–171). Cambridge, UK: Cambridge University Press. ISBN 0-521-81229-1
- Feist, G.J. (2006). The psychology of science and the origins of the scientific mind. New Haven, CT: Yale University Press. ISBN 0-300-11074-X
- Feist, G.J. (2011). Psychology of science as a new subdiscipline in psychology. Current Directions in Psychological Science, 20(5), 330–334. doi:10.1177/0963721411418471
- Feist, G.J., & Gorman, M.E. (1998). Psychology of science: Review and integration of a nascent discipline. Review of General Psychology, 2(1), 3–47. doi:10.1037/1089-2680.2.1.3
- Feist, G.J., & Gorman, M.E. (Eds.) (2013). Handbook of the psychology of science. New York: Springer Pub. Co. ISBN 9780826106230
- Fuller, S. (1993, 2nd edition). Philosophy of science and its discontents. New York: Guilford Press. ISBN 0898620201
- Giere, R. (Ed.) (1992). Cognitive models of science. Minneapolis, MN: Minnesota University Press. ISBN 0816619794
- Gholson, B., Shadish, W.R., Neimeyer, R.A., & Houts, A.C. (Eds.) (1989). Psychology of science: Contributions to metascience. Cambridge: Cambridge University Press.ISBN 0-521-35410-2
- Gorman, M.E. (1992). Simulating science: Heuristics, mental models and technoscientific thinking. Bloomington: Indiana University Press. ISBN 0-253-32608-7
- Greene, J.A., Sandoval, W.A., & Bråten, I. (Eds.) (2016). Handbook of epistemic cognition. New York: Routledge. ISBN 9781138013407, doi:10.4324/9781315795225
- Klahr, D. (2000). Exploring science: The cognition and development of discovery processes. Cambridge, MA: MIT Press. ISBN 0-262-11248-5
- Koslowski, B. (1996). Theory and evidence: The development of scientific reasoning. Cambridge, MA: MIT Press. ISBN 0-262-11209-4
- Kuhn, D. (1993). Science as argument: Implications for teaching and learning scientific thinking. Science Education, 77(3), 319–337. doi:10.1002/sce.3730770306
- Kuhn, D., E. Amsel, & M. O'Loughlin. (1988). The development of scientific thinking skills. Orlando FL: Academic Press. ISBN 0-12-428430-2
- Magnani, L., Nersessian, N.J., & Thagard, P. (Eds.) (1999). Model-based reasoning in scientific discovery. New York: Kluwer Academic/Plenum. ISBN 0306462923, doi:10.1007/978-1-4615-4813-3
- Maslow, A. The psychology of science: A reconnaissance, New York: Harper & Row, 1966; Chapel Hill: Maurice Bassett, 2002.
- Mitroff, I. (1974). The subjective side of science. Amsterdam: Elsevier. ISBN 0914105213
- Osbeck, L.M., Nersessian, N.J., Malone, K.R., & Newstetter, W.C. (2011). Science as psychology: Sense-making and identity in science practice. New York: Cambridge University Press. ISBN 9780521882071, doi:10.1017/CBO9780511933936
- Proctor, R.W. & Capaldi, E.J. (Eds.) (2012). Psychology of science: Implicit and explicit processes. Oxford; New York: Oxford University Press. ISBN 9780199753628, doi:10.1093/acprof:oso/9780199753628.001.0001
- Rutjens, B. T., Heine, S. J., Sutton, R. M., & van Harreveld, F. (2018). Attitudes towards science. Advances in Experimental Social Psychology, 57, 125-165.
- Rutjens, B. T., Sutton, R. M., & van der Lee, R. (2018). Not all skepticism is equal: Exploring the ideological antecedents of science acceptance and rejection. Personality and Social Psychology Bulletin, 44(3), 384-405.
- Shadish, W., & Fuller, S. (1994). The social psychology of science. Guilford Press. ISBN 0-89862-021-X
- Simonton, D.K. (1988). Scientific genius: A psychology of science. Cambridge, UK: Cambridge University Press. ISBN 0-521-35287-8
- Simonton, D.K. (2004). Creativity in science: Chance, logic, genius, and Zeitgeist. Cambridge, UK: Cambridge University Press. ISBN 0-521-35287-8
- Sulloway, F. J. (1996). Born to rebel: Birth order, family dynamics, and creative lives. New York: Pantheon. ISBN 0-679-75876-3
- Thagard, P. (1992). Conceptual revolutions. Princeton, NJ: Princeton University Press. ISBN 0-691-02490-1
- Thagard, P. (2012). The cognitive science of science: Explanation, discovery, and conceptual change. Cambridge, MA: MIT Press. ISBN 9780262017282, doi:10.7551/mitpress/9218.001.0001
- Tweney, R.D. (1989). A framework for the cognitive psychology of science. In B. Gholson Shadish Jr., W.R., Neimeyer, R.A., & Houts, A. C. (Eds.), Psychology of science: Contributions to metascience (pp. 342–366). Cambridge, UK: Cambridge University Press. ISBN 0-521-35410-2
- Zubrowski, B. (2009). Exploration and meaning making in the learning of science. Dordrecht; New York: Springer. ISBN 9789048124954, doi:10.1007/978-90-481-2496-1
