= Nancy J. Nersessian =

American academic

Nancy J. Nersessian is the Regents' Professor and Professor of Cognitive Science at the Georgia Institute of Technology.

She is a fellow of the American Association for the Advancement of Science. She has been a foreign member of the Royal Netherlands Academy of Arts and Sciences since 2006.

== Life ==
She graduated from Boston University and Case Western Reserve University .Her work is in the areas of the philosophy of science, the history of science, and the psychology of science.

In 2005–2006, she was a Radcliffe Institute fellow. Her book, Interdisciplinarity in the making: Models and Methods in Frontier Science, was long listed for the Al-Rodhan Transdisciplinary Philosophy Book Prize.

== Works ==
- Interdisciplinary in the Making: Models and Methods in Frontier Science (MIT Press, 2022), ISBN 9780262544665
- Creating Scientific Concepts (MIT Press, 2008), ISBN 0-262-14105-1
- Model-Based Reasoning: Science, Technology, and Values (edited with L. Magnani; Kluwer 2001), ISBN 0-306-47244-9
- Model-Based Reasoning in Scientific Discovery (edited with L. Magnani and P. Thagard; Plenum 1999), ISBN 0-306-46292-3
- Faraday to Einstein: Constructing Meaning in Scientific Theories (Kluwer, 1984, 1990), ISBN 90-247-2997-1
