= Heather Douglas (philosopher) =

Heather Douglas (born March 21, 1969) is a philosopher of science best known for her work on the role of values in science, science policy, the importance of science for policymaking, and the history of philosophy of science. Douglas is a professor in the Department of Philosophy at Michigan State University. She formerly held the Waterloo Chair in Science and Society at the University of Waterloo, and taught at University of Pittsburgh, University of Tennessee, and University of Puget Sound. She is the author of Science, policy and the value-free ideal (2009), an influential book on the way that values do and should influence science in the context of policy.

== Life and career ==
Heather Douglas received her PhD in History and Philosophy of Science (HPS) at the University of Pittsburgh in 1998. She taught at the University of Puget Sound from 1998 to 2004 as the Phibbs Assistant Professor of Science and Ethics. Douglas worked at University of Tennessee from 2004 to 2011, where she was promoted from Assistant Professor to associate professor in 2008. In 2012, Douglas became the Waterloo Chair in Science and Society at the University of Waterloo, where she was also Professor at the Balsillie School of International Affairs until 2018. Douglas is a member of SRPoiSE, The Consortium for Socially Relevant Philosophy of/in Science and Engineering.

== Selected bibliography ==
- "Science, policy and the value-free ideal". Pittsburgh, Pennsylvania: University of Pittsburgh Press. 2009. ISBN 978-0-8229-6026-3.
- "Inductive risk and values in science" (2000), Philosophy of Science 67 (4), 559–579
- "The irreducible complexity of objectivity" (2004), Synthese 138 (3), 453–473
- "Bullshit at the Interface of Science and Policy: Global Warming, Toxic Substances, and Other Pesky Problems" (2006), in "Bullshit and Philosophy: Guaranteed to Get Perfect Results Every Time", Gary L. Hardcastle, George A. Reisch (eds). ISBN 9780812696110, Open Court Publishing.
- "Science, Values, and Democracy: The 2016 Descartes Lectures" (2021), Ted Richards (ed.) ISBN 9780999587799, Consortium for Science, Policy & Outcomes, Arizona State University.
- "The role of scientific expertise in democracy" (2021), Michael Hannon, Jeroen de Ridder (eds) ISBN 978-0-367-34590-7, The Routledge Handbook of Political Epistemology, Routledge.
