= Glossary of set theory =

This is a glossary of terms and definitions related to the topic of set theory.

== Greek ==
α
Often used for an ordinal.
β
1. βX is the Stone–Čech compactification of X.
2. An ordinal.
γ
A gamma number, an ordinal of the form ω^{α}.
Γ
The Gamma function of ordinals. In particular Γ_{0} is the Feferman–Schütte ordinal.
δ
1. A delta number is an ordinal of the form ω^{ω^{α}}.
2. A limit ordinal.
Δ (Greek capital delta, not to be confused with a triangle ∆)
1. A set of formulas in the Lévy hierarchy.
2. A delta system
ε
An epsilon number, an ordinal with ω^{ε}=ε.
η
1. The order type of the rational numbers.
2. An eta set, a type of ordered set.
3. η_{α} is an Erdős cardinal.
θ
The order type of the real numbers.
Θ
The supremum of the ordinals that are the image of a function from ^{ω}ω (usually in models where the axiom of choice is not assumed).
κ
1. Often used for a cardinal, especially the critical point of an elementary embedding.
2. The Erdős cardinal κ(α) is the smallest cardinal such that κ(α) → (α)^{< ω}.
λ
1. Often used for a cardinal.
2. The order type of the real numbers.
μ
A measure.
Π
1. A product of cardinals.
2. A set of formulas in the Lévy hierarchy.
ρ
The rank of a set.
σ
countable, as in σ-compact, σ-complete and so on.
Σ
1. A sum of cardinals.
2. A set of formulas in the Lévy hierarchy.
φ
A Veblen function.
ω
1. The smallest infinite ordinal.
2. ω_{α} is an alternative name for ℵ_{α}, used when it is considered as an ordinal number rather than a cardinal number.
Ω
1. The class of all ordinals, related to Cantor's absolute.
2. Ω-logic is a form of logic introduced by Hugh Woodin.

== !$@ ==
∈, =, ⊆, ⊇, ⊃, ⊂, ∪, ∩, ∅
Standard first-order set theoretical symbols with their usual definitions, (is a member of, equals, is a subset of, is a superset of, is a proper superset of, is a proper subset of, union, intersection, empty set)
∧ ∨ → ↔ ¬ ∀ ∃
Standard logical symbols with their usual definitions; and (conjunction), or (inclusive disjunction), implies (conditional), is equivalent to (biconditional), not (negation), for all (universal quantifier), there exists (existential quantifier).
≡
An equivalence, or congruence relation.
↾
f↾X once denoted the corestriction of a relation, or mapping, but in modern mathematics is the restriction of a relation, or mapping f, to some set X, as-in,
1.) f↾X≔{(x,y):x∈X and y∈X} — the restriction, and corestriction — for a relation f to X.
2.) f↾X≔{f(x):x∈X} — the restriction of the domain — for a mapping f to X.
↿
f↿X is the restriction of a relation or mapping f, to some set X.
△ (A triangle, not to be confused with the Greek letter Δ)
1. For X△Y, the symmetric difference of sets X, and Y, as-in, X△Y≔{x:x∈X-Y or x∈Y-X}.
2. A diagonal intersection.
◊
The diamond principle.
♣
A clubsuit principle.
□
The square principle, or Q.E.D. — quod erat demonstrandum — that which was to be demonstrated.
∘
The composition of functions
⁀
1. α⁀b is the extension of a sequence a, by an element b, as-in,
2. For an α-sequence, a, a⁀b≔a⨿{b} such that b is the α-th element of a.
+
1. Addition of ordinals.
2. Addition of cardinals.
3. α^{+} is the successor cardinal, or the least cardinal greater than α.
4. B^{+} is the poset of nonzero elements of a Boolean algebra B.
5. The inclusive or operation in a Boolean algebra (in ring theory it is used for the exclusive or operation).
~
1. For sets a, and b, a~b is the set of elements of a not in b, called the difference of, a and b, as-in,
2. a~b≔{α:α∈a and α∉b}.
3. An equivalence relation.
∖
Synonym of ~.
−
Synonym of ~.
≈
Has the same cardinality as.
×
For sets a, and b, a×b≔{(c,d):c∈a and d∈b}, called the product of sets a, and b.
/
For a set a, and an equivalence relation ~, a/~≔{b/~:b∈a}, called the quotient of a set by an equivalence relation ~.
×
For ordinals a, and b, a×b≔𝙾𝚛𝚍(a×b) called the ordinal product of ordinals a, and b.
⊗
For cardinals a, and b, a⊗b≔𝙲𝚛𝚍(a×b), called the cardinal product of cardinals a, and b.
*
An operation that takes a forcing poset and a name for a forcing poset and produces a new forcing poset.
∞
The class of all ordinals, or at least something larger than all ordinals
$\alpha^\beta$
1. Cardinal exponentiation
2. Ordinal exponentiation
${}^\beta\alpha$
1. The set of functions from β to α
→
1. Implies
2. f: X → Y means f is a function from X to Y.
3. The ordinary partition symbol, where κ→(λ)^{n}_{m} means that for every coloring of the n-element subsets of κ with m colors there is a subset of size λ all of whose n-element subsets are the same color.
f′x
If there is a unique y such that ⟨x,y⟩ is in f then f′x is y, otherwise it is the empty set. So if f is a function and x is in its domain, then f′x is f(x).
f″X
f″X is the image of a set X by f. If f is a function whose domain contains X this is {f(x):x∈X}
[ ]
1. M[G] is the smallest model of ZF containing G and all elements of M.
2. [α]^{β} is the set of all subsets of a set α of cardinality β, or of an ordered set α of order type β
3. [x] is the equivalence class of x
{ }
1. {a, b, ...} is the set with elements a, b, ...
2. {x : φ(x)} is the set of x such that φ(x)
⟨ ⟩
⟨a,b⟩ is an ordered pair, and similarly for ordered n-tuples
$|X|$
The cardinality of a set X
$\|\varphi\|$
The value of a formula φ in some Boolean algebra
⌜φ⌝
⌜φ⌝ (Quine quotes, unicode U+231C, U+231D) is the Gödel number of a formula φ
⊦
A⊦φ means that the formula φ follows from the theory A
⊧
A⊧φ means that the formula φ holds in the model A
⊩
The forcing relation
≺
An elementary embedding
⊥
The false symbol
p⊥q means that p and q are incompatible elements of a partial order
0^{#}
zero sharp, the set of true formulas about indiscernibles and order-indiscernibles in the constructible universe
0^{†}
zero dagger, a certain set of true formulas
$\aleph$
The Hebrew letter aleph, which indexes the aleph numbers or infinite cardinals ℵ_{α}
$\beth$
The Hebrew letter beth, which indexes the beth numbers ב_{α}
$\gimel$
A serif form of the Hebrew letter gimel, representing the gimel function $\gimel(\kappa)=\kappa^{\operatorname{cf} \kappa}$
ת
The Hebrew letter Taw, used by Cantor for the class of all cardinal numbers

== A ==
𝔞
The almost disjointness number, the least size of a maximal almost disjoint family of infinite subsets of ω
A
The Suslin operation
absolute
1. A statement is called absolute if its truth in some model implies its truth in certain related models
2. Cantor's absolute is a somewhat unclear concept sometimes used to mean the class of all sets
3. Cantor's Absolute infinite Ω is a somewhat unclear concept related to the class of all ordinals
AC
1. AC is the Axiom of choice
2. AC_{ω} is the Axiom of countable choice
AD
The axiom of determinacy
add
additivity
The additivity add(I) of I is the smallest number of sets of I with union not in I
additively
An ordinal is called additively indecomposable if it is not the sum of a finite number of smaller ordinals. These are the same as gamma numbers or powers of ω.
admissible
An admissible set is a model of Kripke–Platek set theory, and an admissible ordinal is an ordinal α such that L_{α} is an admissible set
AH
The generalized continuum hypothesis states that 2^{ℵ_{α}} = ℵ_{α+1}
aleph
1. The Hebrew letter ℵ
2. An infinite cardinal
3. The aleph function taking ordinals to infinite cardinals
4. The aleph hypothesis is a form of the generalized continuum hypothesis
almost universal
A class is called almost universal if every subset of it is contained in some member of it
amenable
An amenable set is a set that is a model of Kripke–Platek set theory without the axiom of collection
analytic
An analytic set is the continuous image of a Polish space. (This is not the same as an analytical set)
analytical
The analytical hierarchy is a hierarchy of subsets of an effective Polish space (such as ω). They are definable by a second-order formula without parameters, and an analytical set is a set in the analytical hierarchy. (This is not the same as an analytic set)
antichain
An antichain is a set of pairwise incompatible elements of a poset
anti-foundation axiom
An axiom in set theory that allows for the existence of non-well-founded sets, in contrast to the traditional foundation axiom which prohibits such sets.
antinomy
paradox
arithmetic
The ordinal arithmetic is arithmetic on ordinal numbers
The cardinal arithmetic is arithmetic on cardinal numbers
arithmetical
The arithmetical hierarchy is a hierarchy of subsets of a Polish space that can be defined by first-order formulas
Aronszajn
1. Nachman Aronszajn
2. An Aronszajn tree is an uncountable tree such that all branches and levels are countable. More generally a κ-Aronszajn tree is a tree of cardinality κ such that all branches and levels have cardinality less than κ
atom
1. An urelement, something that is not a set but allowed to be an element of a set
2. An element of a poset such that any two elements smaller than it are compatible.
3. A set of positive measure such that every measurable subset has the same measure or measure 0
atomic
An atomic formula (in set theory) is one of the form x=y or x∈y
axiom
Aczel's anti-foundation axiom states that every accessible pointed directed graph corresponds to a unique set
AD+ An extension of the axiom of determinacy
Axiom F states that the class of all ordinals is Mahlo
Axiom of adjunction Adjoining a set to another set produces a set
Axiom of amalgamation The union of all elements of a set is a set. Same as axiom of union
Axiom of choice The product of any set of non-empty sets is non-empty
Axiom of collection This can mean either the axiom of replacement or the axiom of separation
Axiom of comprehension The class of all sets with a given property is a set. Usually contradictory.
Axiom of constructibility Any set is constructible, often abbreviated as V=L
Axiom of countability Every set is hereditarily countable
Axiom of countable choice The product of a countable number of non-empty sets is non-empty
Axiom of dependent choice A weak form of the axiom of choice
Axiom of determinacy Certain games are determined, in other words one player has a winning strategy
Axiom of elementary sets describes the sets with 0, 1, or 2 elements
Axiom of empty set The empty set exists
Axiom of extensionality or axiom of extent
Axiom of finite choice Any product of non-empty finite sets is non-empty
Axiom of foundation Same as axiom of regularity
Axiom of global choice There is a global choice function
Axiom of heredity (any member of a set is a set; used in Ackermann's system.)
Axiom of infinity There is an infinite set
Axiom of limitation of size A class is a set if and only if it has smaller cardinality than the class of all sets
Axiom of pairing Unordered pairs of sets are sets
Axiom of power set The powerset of any set is a set
Axiom of projective determinacy Certain games given by projective set are determined, in other words one player has a winning strategy
Axiom of real determinacy Certain games are determined, in other words one player has a winning strategy
Axiom of regularity Sets are well founded
Axiom of replacement The image of a set under a function is a set. Same as axiom of substitution
Axiom of subsets The powerset of a set is a set. Same as axiom of powersets
Axiom of substitution The image of a set under a function is a set
Axiom of union The union of all elements of a set is a set
Axiom schema of predicative separation Axiom of separation for formulas whose quantifiers are bounded
Axiom schema of replacement The image of a set under a function is a set
Axiom schema of separation The elements of a set with some property form a set
Axiom schema of specification The elements of a set with some property form a set. Same as axiom schema of separation
Freiling's axiom of symmetry is equivalent to the negation of the continuum hypothesis
Martin's axiom states very roughly that cardinals less than the cardinality of the continuum behave like ℵ_{0}.
The proper forcing axiom is a strengthening of Martin's axiom

== B ==
𝔟
The bounding number, the least size of an unbounded family of sequences of natural numbers
B
A Boolean algebra
BA
Baumgartner's axiom, one of three axioms introduced by Baumgartner.
BACH
Baumgartner's axiom plus the continuum hypothesis.
Baire
1. René-Louis Baire
2. A subset of a topological space has the Baire property if it differs from an open set by a meager set
3. The Baire space is a topological space whose points are sequences of natural numbers
4. A Baire space is a topological space such that every intersection of a countable collection of open dense sets is dense
basic set theory
1. Naive set theory
2. A weak set theory, given by Kripke–Platek set theory without the axiom of collection. Sometimes also called "rudimentary set theory".
BC
Berkeley cardinal
BD
Borel determinacy
Berkeley cardinal
A Berkeley cardinal is a cardinal κ in a model of ZF such that for every transitive set M that includes κ, there is a nontrivial elementary embedding of M into M with critical point below κ.
Bernays
1. Paul Bernays
2. Bernays–Gödel set theory is a set theory with classes
Berry's paradox
Berry's paradox considers the smallest positive integer not definable in ten words
beth
1. The Hebrew letter ב
2. A beth number ב_{α}
Beth
Evert Willem Beth, as in Beth definability
BG
Bernays–Gödel set theory without the axiom of choice
BGC
Bernays–Gödel set theory with the axiom of choice
boldface
The boldface hierarchy is a hierarchy of subsets of a Polish space, definable by second-order formulas with parameters (as opposed to the lightface hierarchy which does not allow parameters). It includes the Borel sets, analytic sets, and projective sets
Boolean algebra
A Boolean algebra is a commutative ring such that all elements satisfy x^{2}=x
Borel
1. Émile Borel
2. A Borel set is a set in the smallest sigma algebra containing the open sets
bounding number
The bounding number is the least size of an unbounded family of sequences of natural numbers
BP
Baire property
BS
BST
Basic set theory
Burali-Forti
1. Cesare Burali-Forti
2. The Burali-Forti paradox states that the ordinal numbers do not form a set

== C ==
c
𝔠
The cardinality of the continuum
∁
Complement of a set
C
The Cantor set
cac
countable antichain condition (same as the countable chain condition)
Cantor
1. Georg Cantor
2. The Cantor normal form of an ordinal is its base ω expansion.
3. Cantor's paradox says that the powerset of a set is larger than the set, which gives a contradiction when applied to the universal set.
4. The Cantor set, a perfect nowhere dense subset of the real line
5. Cantor's absolute infinite Ω is something to do with the class of all ordinals
6. Cantor's absolute is a somewhat unclear concept sometimes used to mean the class of all sets
7. Cantor's theorem states that the powerset operation increases cardinalities
Card
The cardinality of a set
Cartesian product
The set of all ordered pairs obtained from two sets, where each pair consists of one element from each set.
cardinal
1. A cardinal number is an ordinal with more elements than any smaller ordinal
cardinality
The number of elements of a set
categorical
1. A theory is called categorical if all models are isomorphic. This definition is no longer used much, as first-order theories with infinite models are never categorical.
2. A theory is called k-categorical if all models of cardinality κ are isomorphic
category
1. A set of first category is the same as a meager set: a set that is the union of a countable number of nowhere-dense sets, and a set of second category is a set that is not of first category.
2. A category in the sense of category theory.
ccc
countable chain condition
cf
The cofinality of an ordinal
CH
The continuum hypothesis
chain
A linearly ordered subset (of a poset)
characteristic function
A function that indicates membership of an element in a set, taking the value 1 if the element is in the set and 0 otherwise.
choice function
A function that, given a set of non-empty sets, assigns to each set an element from that set. Fundamental in the formulation of the axiom of choice in set theory.
choice negation
In logic, an operation that negates the principles underlying the axiom of choice, exploring alternative set theories where the axiom does not hold.
choice set
A set constructed from a collection of non-empty sets by selecting one element from each set, related to the concept of a choice function.
cl
Abbreviation for "closure of" (a set under some collection of operations)
class
1. A class is a collection of sets
2. First class ordinals are finite ordinals, and second class ordinals are countable infinite ordinals
class comprehension schema
A principle in set theory allowing the formation of classes based on properties or conditions that their members satisfy.
club
A contraction of "closed unbounded"
1. A club set is a closed unbounded subset, often of an ordinal
2. The club filter is the filter of all subsets containing a club set
3. Clubsuit is a combinatorial principle similar to but weaker than the diamond principle
coanalytic
A coanalytic set is the complement of an analytic set
cofinal
A subset of a poset is called cofinal if every element of the poset is at most some element of the subset.
cof
cofinality
cofinality
1. The cofinality of a poset (especially an ordinal or cardinal) is the smallest cardinality of a cofinal subset
2. The cofinality cof(I) of an ideal I of subsets of a set X is the smallest cardinality of a subset B of I such that every element of I is a subset of something in B.
cofinite
Referring to a set whose complement in a larger set is finite, often used in discussions of topology and set theory.
Cohen
1. Paul Cohen
2. Cohen forcing is a method for constructing models of ZFC
3. A Cohen algebra is a Boolean algebra whose completion is free
Col
collapsing algebra
A collapsing algebra Col(κ,λ) collapses cardinals between λ and κ
combinatorial set theory
A branch of set theory focusing on the study of combinatorial properties of sets and their implications for the structure of the mathematical universe.
compact cardinal
A cardinal number that is uncountable and has the property that any collection of sets of that cardinality has a subcollection of the same cardinality with a non-empty intersection.
complement (of a set)
The set containing all elements not in the given set, within a larger set considered as the universe.
complete
1. "Complete set" is an old term for "transitive set"
2. A theory is called complete if it assigns a truth value (true or false) to every statement of its language
3. An ideal is called κ-complete if it is closed under the union of less than κ elements
4. A measure is called κ-complete if the union of less than κ measure 0 sets has measure 0
5. A linear order is called complete if every nonempty bounded subset has a least upper bound
Con
Con(T) for a theory T means T is consistent
condensation lemma
Gödel's condensation lemma says that an elementary submodel of an element L_{α} of the constructible hierarchy is isomorphic to an element L_{γ} of the constructible hierarchy
constructible
A set is called constructible if it is in the constructible universe.
continuum
The continuum is the real line or its cardinality
continuum hypothesis
The hypothesis in set theory that there is no set whose cardinality is strictly between that of the integers and the real numbers.
continuum many
An informal way of saying that a set has the cardinality of the continuum, the size of the set of real numbers.
continuum problem
The problem of determining the possible cardinalities of infinite sets, including whether the continuum hypothesis is true.
core
A core model is a special sort of inner model generalizing the constructible universe
countable
A set is countable if it is finite or if its elements can be put into a one-to-one correspondence with the natural numbers.
countable antichain condition
A term used for the countable chain condition by authors who think terminology should be logical
countable cardinal
A cardinal number that represents the size of a countable set, typically the cardinality of the set of natural numbers.
countable chain condition
The countable chain condition (ccc) for a poset states that every antichain is countable
countable ordinal
An ordinal number that represents the order type of a well-ordered set that is countable, including all finite ordinals and the first infinite ordinal, $\omega$.
countably infinite
A set that has the same cardinality as the set of natural numbers, meaning its elements can be listed in a sequence without end.
cov(I)
covering number
The covering number cov(I) of an ideal I of subsets of X is the smallest number of sets in I whose union is X.
critical
1. The critical point κ of an elementary embedding j is the smallest ordinal κ with j(κ) > κ
2. A critical number of a function j is an ordinal κ with j(κ) = κ. This is almost the opposite of the first meaning.
CRT
The critical point of something
CTM
Countable transitive model
cumulative hierarchy
A cumulative hierarchy is a sequence of sets indexed by ordinals that satisfies certain conditions and whose union is used as a model of set theory

== D ==
𝔡
The dominating number of a poset
DC
The axiom of dependent choice
Dedekind
1. Richard Dedekind
2. A Dedekind-infinite set is a set that can be put into a one-to-one correspondence with one of its proper subsets, indicating a type of infinity; a Dedekind-finite set is a set that is not Dedekind-infinite. (These are also spelled without the hyphen, as "Dedekind finite" and "Dedekind infinite".)
def
The set of definable subsets of a set
definable
A subset of a set is called definable set if it is the collection of elements satisfying a sentence in some given language
delta
1. A delta number is an ordinal of the form ω^{ω^{α}}
2. A delta system, also called a sunflower, is a collection of sets such that any two distinct sets have intersection X for some fixed set X
denumerable
countable and infinite
dependent choice
See Axiom of dependent choice
determinateness
See Axiom of extensionality
Df
The set of definable subsets of a set
diagonal argument
Cantor's diagonal argument
diagonalization
A method used in set theory and logic to construct a set or sequence that is not in a given collection by ensuring it differs from each member of the collection in at least one element.
diagonal intersection
If $\displaystyle\langle X_\alpha \mid \alpha<\delta\rangle$ is a sequence of subsets of an ordinal $\displaystyle\delta$, then the diagonal intersection $\displaystyle\Delta_{\alpha<\delta} X_\alpha,$ is $\displaystyle\{\beta<\delta\mid\beta\in \bigcap_{\alpha<\beta} X_\alpha\}.$
diamond principle
Jensen's diamond principle states that there are sets A_{α}⊆α for α<ω_{1} such that for any subset A of ω_{1} the set of α with A∩α = A_{α} is stationary in ω_{1}.
discrete
A property of a set or space that consists of distinct, separate elements or points, with no intermediate values.
disjoint
Referring to sets that have no element in common, i.e., their intersection is empty.
dom
The domain of a function
DST
Descriptive set theory

== E ==
E
E(X) is the membership relation of the set X
Easton's theorem
Easton's theorem describes the possible behavior of the powerset function on regular cardinals
EATS
The statement "every Aronszajn tree is special"
effectively decidable set
A set for which there exists an algorithm that can determine, for any given element, whether it belongs to the set.
effectively enumerable set
A set whose members can be listed or enumerated by some algorithm, even if the list is potentially infinite.
element
An individual object or member of a set.
elementary
An elementary embedding is a function preserving all properties describable in the language of set theory
empty set
The unique set that contains no elements, denoted by $\emptyset$.
empty set axiom
See Axiom of empty set.
enumerable set
A set whose elements can be put into a one-to-one correspondence with the set of natural numbers, making it countable.
enumeration
The process of listing or counting elements in a set, especially for countable sets.
epsilon
1. An epsilon number is an ordinal α such that α=ω^{α}
2. Epsilon zero (ε_{0}) is the smallest epsilon number
equicardinal
Synonym of equinumerous
equinumerous
Having the same cardinal number or number of elements, used to describe two sets that can be put into a one-to-one correspondence.
equipollent
Synonym of equinumerous
equipotent
Synonym of equinumerous
equivalence class
A subset within a set, defined by an equivalence relation, where every element in the subset is equivalent to each other under that relation.
Erdos
Erdős
1. Paul Erdős
2. An Erdős cardinal is a large cardinal satisfying a certain partition condition. (They are also called partition cardinals.)
3. The Erdős–Rado theorem extends Ramsey's theorem to infinite cardinals
ethereal cardinal
An ethereal cardinal is a type of large cardinal similar in strength to subtle cardinals
Euler diagram
1. A graphical representation of the logical relationships between sets, using overlapping circles to illustrate intersections, unions, and complements of sets.
extender
An extender is a system of ultrafilters encoding an elementary embedding
extendible cardinal
A cardinal κ is called extendible if for all η there is a nontrivial elementary embedding of V_{κ+η} into some V_{λ} with critical point κ
extension
1. If R is a relation on a class then the extension of an element y is the class of x such that xRy
2. An extension of a model is a larger model containing it
extensional
1. A relation R on a class is called extensional if every element y of the class is determined by its extension
2. A class is called extensional if the relation ∈ on the class is extensional

== F ==
F
An F_{σ} is a union of a countable number of closed sets
Feferman–Schütte ordinal
The Feferman–Schütte ordinal Γ_{0} is in some sense the smallest impredicative ordinal
filter
A filter is a non-empty subset of a poset that is downward-directed and upwards-closed
finite intersection property
FIP
The finite intersection property, abbreviated FIP, says that the intersection of any finite number of elements of a set is non-empty
first
1. A set of first category is the same as a meager set: one that is the union of a countable number of nowhere-dense sets.
2. An ordinal of the first class is a finite ordinal
3. An ordinal of the first kind is a successor ordinal
4. First-order logic allows quantification over elements of a model, but not over subsets
Fodor
1. Géza Fodor
2. Fodor's lemma states that a regressive function on a regular uncountable cardinal is constant on a stationary subset.
forcing
Forcing (mathematics) is a method of adjoining a generic filter G of a poset P to a model of set theory M to obtain a new model M[G]
formula
Something formed from atomic formulas x=y, x∈y using ∀∃∧∨¬
foundation axiom
See Axiom of foundation
Fraenkel
Abraham Fraenkel

== G ==
𝖌
The groupwise density number
G
1. A generic ultrafilter
2. A G_{δ} is a countable intersection of open sets
gamma number
A gamma number is an ordinal of the form ω^{α}
GCH
Generalized continuum hypothesis
generalized continuum hypothesis
The generalized continuum hypothesis states that 2^{א_{α}} = א_{α+1}
generic
1. A generic filter of a poset P is a filter that intersects all dense subsets of P that are contained in some model M.
2. A generic extension of a model M is a model M[G] for some generic filter G.
gimel
1. The Hebrew letter gimel $\gimel$
2. The gimel function $\gimel(\kappa)=\kappa^{\text{cf}(\kappa)}$
3. The gimel hypothesis states that $\gimel(\kappa)=\max(2^{\text{cf}(\kappa)},\kappa^+)$
global choice
The axiom of global choice says there is a well ordering of the class of all sets
global well-ordering
Another name for the axiom of global choice
greatest lower bound
The largest value that serves as a lower bound for a set in a partially ordered set, also known as the infimum.
Godel
Gödel
1. Kurt Gödel
2. A Gödel number is a number assigned to a formula
3. The Gödel universe is another name for the constructible universe
4. Gödel's incompleteness theorems show that sufficiently powerful consistent recursively enumerable theories cannot be complete
5. Gödel's completeness theorem states that consistent first-order theories have models

== H ==
𝔥
The distributivity number
H
Abbreviation for "hereditarily"
H_{κ}
H(κ)
The set of sets that are hereditarily of cardinality less than κ
Hartogs
1. Friedrich Hartogs
2. The Hartogs number of a set X is the least ordinal α such that there is no injection from α into X.
Hausdorff
1. Felix Hausdorff
2. A Hausdorff gap is a gap in the ordered set of growth rates of sequences of integers, or in a similar ordered set
HC
The set of hereditarily countable sets
hereditarily
If P is a property the a set is hereditarily P if all elements of its transitive closure have property P. Examples: Hereditarily countable set Hereditarily finite set
Hessenberg
1. Gerhard Hessenberg
2. The Hessenberg sum and Hessenberg product are commutative operations on ordinals
HF
The set of hereditarily finite sets
Hilbert
1. David Hilbert
2. Hilbert's paradox states that a Hotel with an infinite number of rooms can accommodate extra guests even if it is full
HS
The class of hereditarily symmetric sets
HOD
The class of hereditarily ordinal definable sets
huge cardinal
1. A huge cardinal is a cardinal number κ such that there exists an elementary embedding j : V → M with critical point κ from V into a transitive inner model M containing all sequences of length j(κ) whose elements are in M
2. An ω-huge cardinal is a large cardinal related to the I_{1} rank-into-rank axiom
hyperarithmetic
A hyperarithmetic set is a subset of the natural numbers given by a transfinite extension of the notion of arithmetic set
hyperinaccessible
hyper-inaccessible
1. "Hyper-inaccessible cardinal" usually means a 1-inaccessible cardinal
2. "Hyper-inaccessible cardinal" sometimes means a cardinal κ that is a 'κ-inaccessible cardinal
3. "Hyper-inaccessible cardinal" occasionally means a Mahlo cardinal
hyper-Mahlo
A hyper-Mahlo cardinal is a cardinal κ that is a κ-Mahlo cardinal
hyperset
A set that can contain itself as a member or is defined in terms of a circular or self-referential structure, used in the study of non-well-founded set theories.
hyperverse
The hyperverse is the set of countable transitive models of ZFC

== I ==
𝔦
The independence number
I0, I1, I2, I3
The rank-into-rank large cardinal axioms
ideal
An ideal in the sense of ring theory, usually of a Boolean algebra, especially the Boolean algebra of subsets of a set
iff
if and only if
improper

See proper, below.

inaccessible cardinal
A (weakly or strongly) inaccessible cardinal is a regular uncountable cardinal that is a (weak or strong) limit
indecomposable ordinal
An indecomposable ordinal is a nonzero ordinal that is not the sum of two smaller ordinals, or equivalently an ordinal of the form ω^{α} or a gamma number.
independence number
The independence number 𝔦 is the smallest possible cardinality of a maximal independent family of subsets of a countable infinite set
indescribable cardinal
An indescribable cardinal is a type of large cardinal that cannot be described in terms of smaller ordinals using a certain language
individual
Something with no elements, either the empty set or an urelement or atom
indiscernible
A set of indiscernibles is a set I of ordinals such that two increasing finite sequences of elements of I have the same first-order properties
inductive
1. An inductive set is a set that can be generated from a base set by repeatedly applying a certain operation, such as the set of natural numbers generated from the number 0 by the successor operation.
2. An inductive definition is a definition that specifies how to construct members of a set based on members already known to be in the set, often used for defining recursively defined sequences, functions, and structures.
3. A poset is called inductive if every non-empty ordered subset has an upper bound
infinity axiom
See Axiom of infinity.
inner model
A model of set theory that is constructed within Zermelo-Fraenkel set theory and contains all ordinals of the universe, serving to explore properties of larger set-theoretic universes from a contained perspective.
ineffable cardinal
An ineffable cardinal is a type of large cardinal related to the generalized Kurepa hypothesis whose consistency strength lies between that of subtle cardinals and remarkable cardinals
inner model
An inner model is a transitive model of ZF containing all ordinals
Int
Interior of a subset of a topological space
integers
The set of whole numbers including positive, negative, and zero, denoted by ℤ.
internal
An archaic term for extensional (relation)
intersection
The set containing all elements that are members of two or more sets, denoted by $A \cap B$ for sets A and B.
iterative conception of set
A philosophical and mathematical notion that sets are formed by iteratively collecting together objects into a new object, a set, which can then itself be included in further sets.

== J ==
j
An elementary embedding
J
Levels of the Jensen hierarchy
Jensen
1. Ronald Jensen
2. The Jensen hierarchy is a variation of the constructible hierarchy
3. Jensen's covering theorem states that if 0^{#} does not exist then every uncountable set of ordinals is contained in a constructible set of the same cardinality
join
In logic and mathematics, particularly in lattice theory, the join of a set of elements is the least upper bound or supremum of those elements, representing their union in the context of set operations or the least element that is greater than or equal to each of them in a partial order.
Jónsson
1. Bjarni Jónsson
2. A Jónsson cardinal is a large cardinal such that for every function f: [κ]^{<ω} → κ there is a set H of order type κ such that for each n, f restricted to n-element subsets of H omits at least one value in κ.
3. A Jónsson function is a function $f:[x]^\omega\to x$ with the property that, for any subset y of x with the same cardinality as x, the restriction of f to $[y]^\omega$ has image x.

== K ==
Kelley
1. John L. Kelley
2. Morse–Kelley set theory (also called Kelley–Morse set theory), a set theory with classes
KH
Kurepa's hypothesis
kind
Ordinals of the first kind are successor ordinals, and ordinals of the second kind are limit ordinals or 0
KM
Morse–Kelley set theory
Kleene–Brouwer ordering
The Kleene–Brouwer ordering is a total order on the finite sequences of ordinals
Kleene hierarchy
A classification of sets of natural numbers or strings based on the complexity of the predicates defining them, using Kleene's arithmetical hierarchy in recursion theory.
König's lemma
A result in graph theory and combinatorics stating that every infinite, finitely branching tree has an infinite path, used in proofs of various mathematical and logical theorems. It is equivalent to the axiom of dependent choice.
König's paradox
A paradox in set theory and combinatorics that arises from incorrect assumptions about infinite sets and their cardinalities, related to König's theorem on the sums and products of cardinals.
KP
Kripke–Platek set theory
Kripke
1. Saul Kripke
2. Kripke–Platek set theory consists roughly of the predicative parts of set theory
Kuratowski
1. Kazimierz Kuratowski
2. A Kuratowski ordered pair is a definition of an ordered pair using only set theoretical concepts, specifically, the ordered pair (a, b) is defined as the set {{a}, {a, b}}.
3. "Kuratowski-Zorn lemma" is an alternative name for Zorn's lemma
Kurepa
1. Đuro Kurepa
2. The Kurepa hypothesis states that Kurepa trees exist
3. A Kurepa tree is a tree (T, <) of height $\omega_1$, each of whose levels is countable, with at least $\aleph_2$ branches

== L ==
L
1. L is the constructible universe, and L_{α} is the hierarchy of constructible sets
2. L_{κλ} is an infinitary language
large cardinal
1. A large cardinal is type of cardinal whose existence cannot be proved in ZFC.
2. A large large cardinal is a large cardinal that is not compatible with the axiom V=L
lattice
A partially ordered set in which any two elements have a unique supremum (least upper bound) and an infimum (greatest lower bound), used in various areas of mathematics and logic.
Laver
1. Richard Laver
2. A Laver function is a function related to supercompact cardinals that takes ordinals to sets
least upper bound
The smallest element in a partially ordered set that is greater than or equal to every element in a subset of that set, also known as the supremum.
Lebesgue
1. Henri Lebesgue
2. Lebesgue measure is a complete translation-invariant measure on the real line
left-narrow
A partially ordered set, (α,≤) in which for all b in α, {c:c∈α∧c≤b} (the down-set of b) is a set.
LEM
Law of the excluded middle
Lévy
1. Azriel Lévy
2. The Lévy collapse is a way of destroying cardinals
3. The Lévy hierarchy classifies formulas in terms of the number of alternations of unbounded quantifiers
lightface
The lightface classes are collections of subsets of an effective Polish space definable by second-order formulas without parameters (as opposed to the boldface hierarchy that allows parameters). They include the arithmetical, hyperarithmetical, and analytical sets
limit
1. A (weak) limit cardinal is a cardinal, usually assumed to be nonzero, that is not the successor κ^{+} of another cardinal κ
2. A strong limit cardinal is a cardinal, usually assumed to be nonzero, larger than the powerset of any smaller cardinal
3. A limit ordinal is an ordinal, usually assumed to be nonzero, that is not the successor α+1 of another ordinal α
limitation-of-size conception of set
A conception that defines sets in such a way as to avoid certain paradoxes by excluding collections that are too large to be sets.
limited
A limited quantifier is the same as a bounded quantifier
LM
Lebesgue measure
local
A property of a set x is called local if it has the form ∃δ V_{δ}⊧ φ(x) for some formula φ
LOTS
Linearly ordered topological space
Löwenheim
1. Leopold Löwenheim
2. The Löwenheim–Skolem theorem states that if a first-order theory has an infinite model then it has a model of any given infinite cardinality
lower bound
An element of a partially ordered set that is less than or equal to every element of a given subset of the set, providing a minimum standard or limit for comparison.
LST
The language of set theory (with a single binary relation ∈)

== M ==
m
1. A measure
2. A natural number
𝔪
The smallest cardinal at which Martin's axiom fails
M
1. A model of ZF set theory
2. M_{α} is an old symbol for the level L_{α} of the constructible universe
MA
Martin's axiom
MAD
Maximally Almost Disjoint
Mac Lane
1. Saunders Mac Lane
2. Mac Lane set theory is Zermelo set theory with the axiom of separation restricted to formulas with bounded quantifiers
Mahlo
1. Paul Mahlo
2. A Mahlo cardinal is an inaccessible cardinal such that the set of inaccessible cardinals less than it is stationary
Martin
1. Donald A. Martin
2. Martin's axiom for a cardinal κ states that for any partial order P satisfying the countable chain condition and any family D of dense sets in P of cardinality at most κ, there is a filter F on P such that F ∩ d is non-empty for every d in D
3. Martin's maximum states that if D is a collection of $\aleph_1$ dense subsets of a notion of forcing that preserves stationary subsets of ω_{1}, then there is a D-generic filter
meager
meagre
A meager set is one that is the union of a countable number of nowhere-dense sets. Also called a set of first category.
measure
1. A measure on a σ-algebra of subsets of a set
2. A probability measure on the algebra of all subsets of some set
3. A measure on the algebra of all subsets of a set, taking values 0 and 1
measurable cardinal
A measurable cardinal is a cardinal number κ such that there exists a κ-additive, non-trivial, 0-1-valued measure on the power set of κ. Most (but not all) authors add the condition that it should be uncountable
meet
In lattice theory, the operation that combines two elements to produce their greatest lower bound, analogous to intersection in set theory.
member
An individual element of a set.
membership
The relation between an element and a set in which the element is included within the set.
mice
Plural of mouse
Milner–Rado paradox
The Milner–Rado paradox states that every ordinal number α less than the successor κ^{+} of some cardinal number κ can be written as the union of sets $X_1,X_2,...$ where $X_n$ is of order type at most κ^{n} for n a positive integer.
MK
Morse–Kelley set theory
MM
Martin's maximum
morass
A morass is a tree with ordinals associated to the nodes and some further structure, satisfying some rather complicated axioms.
Morse
1. Anthony Morse
2. Morse–Kelley set theory, a set theory with classes
Mostowski
1. Andrzej Mostowski
2. The Mostowski collapse is a transitive class associated to a well founded extensional set-like relation.
mouse
A certain kind of structure used in constructing core models; see mouse (set theory)
multiplicative axiom
An old name for the axiom of choice
multiset
A generalization of a set that allows multiple occurrences of its elements, often used in mathematics and computer science to model collections with repetitions.

== N ==
N
1. The set of natural numbers
2. The Baire space ω^{ω}
naïve comprehension schema
An unrestricted principle in set theory allowing the formation of sets based on any property or condition, leading to paradoxes such as Russell's paradox in naïve set theory.
naive set theory
1. Naive set theory can mean set theory developed non-rigorously without axioms
2. Naive set theory can mean the inconsistent theory with the axioms of extensionality and comprehension
3. Naive set theory is an introductory book on set theory by Halmos
natural
The natural sum and natural product of ordinals are the Hessenberg sum and product
NCF
Near Coherence of Filters
no-classes theory
A theory due to Bertrand Russell, and used in his Principia Mathematica, according to which sets can be reduced to certain kinds of propositional function formulae. (In Russell's time, the distinction between "class" and "set" had not been developed yet, and Russell used the word "class" in his writings, hence the name "no-class" or "no-classes" theory is retained for this historical reason, although the theory refers to what are now called sets.)
non
non(I) is the uniformity of I, the smallest cardinality of a subset of X not in the ideal I of subsets of X
nonstat
nonstationary
1. A subset of an ordinal is called nonstationary if it is not stationary, in other words if its complement contains a club set
2. The nonstationary ideal I_{NS} is the ideal of nonstationary sets
normal
1. A normal function is a continuous strictly increasing function from ordinals to ordinals
2. A normal filter or normal measure on an ordinal is a filter or measure closed under diagonal intersections
3. The Cantor normal form of an ordinal is its base ω expansion.
NS
Nonstationary
null
German for zero, occasionally used in terms such as "aleph null" (aleph zero) or "null set" (empty set)
number class
The first number class consists of finite ordinals, and the second number class consists of countable ordinals.

== O ==
OCA
The open coloring axiom
OD
The ordinal definable sets
Omega logic
Ω-logic is a form of logic introduced by Hugh Woodin
On
The class of all ordinals
order type
A concept in set theory and logic that categorizes well-ordered sets by their structure, such that two sets have the same order type if there is a bijective function between them that preserves order.
ordinal
1. An ordinal is the order type of a well-ordered set, usually represented by a von Neumann ordinal, a transitive set well ordered by ∈.
2. An ordinal definable set is a set that can be defined by a first-order formula with ordinals as parameters
ot
Abbreviation for "order type of"

== P ==
𝔭
The pseudo-intersection number, the smallest cardinality of a family of infinite subsets of ω that has the strong finite intersection property but has no infinite pseudo-intersection.
P
1. The powerset function
2. A poset
pairing function
A pairing function is a bijection from X×X to X for some set X
pairwise disjoint
A property of a collection of sets where each pair of sets in the collection has no elements in common.
pantachie
pantachy
A pantachy is a maximal chain of a poset
paradox
1. Berry's paradox
2. Burali-Forti's paradox
3. Cantor's paradox
4. Hilbert's paradox
5. König's paradox
6. Milner–Rado paradox
7. Richard's paradox
8. Russell's paradox
9. Skolem's paradox
paradox of denotation
A paradox that uses definite descriptions in an essential way, such as Berry's paradox, König's paradox, and Richard's paradox.
partial order
A transitive antisymmetric, or transitive symmetric relation on a set; see partially ordered set.
partition
A division of a set into disjoint subsets whose union is the entire set, with no element being left out.
partition cardinal
An alternative name for an Erdős cardinal
PCF
Abbreviation for "possible cofinalities", used in PCF theory
PD
The axiom of projective determinacy
perfect set
A perfect set is a subset of a topological set equal to its derived set
permutation
A rearrangement of the elements of a set or sequence, where the structure of the set changes but the elements do not.
permutation model
A permutation model of ZFA is constructed using a group
PFA
The proper forcing axiom
PM
The hypothesis that all projective subsets of the reals are Lebesgue measurable
po
An abbreviation for "partial order" or "poset"
poset
A set with a partial order
positive set theory
A variant of set theory that includes a universal set and possibly other non-standard axioms, focusing on what can be constructed or defined positively.
Polish space
A Polish space is a separable topological space homeomorphic to a complete metric space
pow
Abbreviation for "power (set)"
power
"Power" is an archaic term for cardinality
power set
powerset
The powerset or power set of a set is the set of all its subsets
pre-ordering
A relation that is reflexive and transitive but not necessarily antisymmetric, allowing for the comparison of elements in a set.
primitive recursive set
A set whose characteristic function is a primitive recursive function, indicating that membership in the set can be decided by a computable process.
projective
1. A projective set is a set that can be obtained from an analytic set by repeatedly taking complements and projections
2. Projective determinacy is an axiom asserting that projective sets are determined
proper
1. A proper class is a class that is not a set
2. A proper subset of a set X is a subset not equal to X.
3. A proper forcing is a forcing notion that does not collapse any stationary set
4. The proper forcing axiom asserts that if P is proper and D_{α} is a dense subset of P for each α<ω_{1}, then there is a filter $G \subseteq P$ such that D_{α} ∩ G is nonempty for all α<ω_{1}
PSP
Perfect subset property

pure set
A term for hereditary sets, which are sets that have only other sets as elements, that is, without any urelements.
pure set theory
A set theory that deals only with pure sets, also known as hereditary sets

== Q ==
Q
The (ordered set of) rational numbers
QPD
Quasi-projective determinacy
quantifier
∀ or ∃
Quasi-projective determinacy
All sets of reals in L(R) are determined

== R ==
𝔯
The unsplitting number
R
1. R_{α} is an alternative name for the level V_{α} of the von Neumann hierarchy.
2. The set of real numbers, usually stylized as ℝ
Ramsey
1. Frank P. Ramsey
2. A Ramsey cardinal is a large cardinal satisfying a certain partition condition
ran
The range of a function
rank
1. The rank of a set is the smallest ordinal greater than the ranks of its elements
2. A rank V_{α} is the collection of all sets of rank less than α, for an ordinal α
3. rank-into-rank is a type of large cardinal (axiom)
recursive set
A set for which membership can be decided by a recursive procedure or algorithm, also known as a decidable or computable set.
recursively enumerable set
A set for which there exists a Turing machine that will list all members of the set, possibly without halting if the set is infinite; also called "semi-decidable set" or "Turing recognizable set".
reflecting cardinal
A reflecting cardinal is a type of large cardinal whose strength lies between being weakly compact and Mahlo
reflection principle
A reflection principle states that there is a set similar in some way to the universe of all sets
regressive
A function f from a subset of an ordinal to the ordinal is called regressive if f(α)<α for all α in its domain
regular
A regular cardinal is one equal to its own cofinality; a regular ordinal is a limit ordinal that is equal to its own cofinality.
Reinhardt cardinal
A Reinhardt cardinal is a cardinal in a model V of ZF that is the critical point of an elementary embedding of V into itself
relation
A set or class whose elements are ordered pairs
relative complement
The set of elements that are in one set but not in another, often denoted as $A \setminus B$ for sets $A$ and $B$.
Richard
1. Jules Richard
2. Richard's paradox considers the real number whose nth binary digit is the opposite of the nth digit of the nth definable real number
right-narrow
A partially ordered set, (α,≤) in which for all b in α, {c:c∈α∧b≤c} (the up-set of b) is a set.
RO
The regular open sets of a topological space or poset
Rowbottom
1. Frederick Rowbottom
2. A Rowbottom cardinal is a large cardinal satisfying a certain partition condition
rud
The rudimentary closure of a set
rudimentary
A rudimentary function is a functions definable by certain elementary operations, used in the construction of the Jensen hierarchy
rudimentary set theory
See basic set theory.
Russell
1. Bertrand Russell
2. Russell's paradox is that the set of all sets not containing themselves is contradictory so cannot exist
Russell set
1. The set involved in Russell's paradox

== S ==
𝔰
The splitting number
Satisfaction relation
See ⊨
SBH
Stationary basis hypothesis
SCH
Singular cardinal hypothesis
SCS
Semi-constructive system
Scott
1. Dana Scott
2. Scott's trick is a way of coding proper equivalence classes by sets by taking the elements of the class of smallest rank
second
1. A set of second category is a set that is not of first category: in other words a set that is not the union of a countable number of nowhere-dense sets.
2. An ordinal of the second class is a countable infinite ordinal
3. An ordinal of the second kind is a limit ordinal or 0
4. Second order logic allows quantification over subsets as well as over elements of a model
semi-decidable set
A set for which membership can be determined by a computational process that halts and accepts if the element is a member, but may not halt if the element is not a member.
sentence
A formula with no unbound variables
separating set
1. A separating set is a set containing a given set and disjoint from another given set
2. A separating set is a set S of functions on a set such that for any two distinct points there is a function in S with different values on them.
separation axiom
In set theory, sometimes refers to the Axiom schema of separation; not to be confused with the Separation axiom from topology.
separative
A separative poset is one that can be densely embedded into the poset of nonzero elements of a Boolean algebra.
set
A collection of distinct objects, considered as an object in its own right.
set-theoretic
An adjective referring to set theory. In combination with nouns, it creates the phrases "set-theoretic hierarchy" referring to cumulative hierarchy, "set-theoretic paradox" referring to the paradoxes of set theory, "set-theoretic successor" referring to a successor ordinal or successor cardinal, and "set-theoretic realism" for the position in philosophy of mathematics which defends that sets, as conceived in set theory, exist independently of human thought and language, similar to mathematical Platonism.
singleton
A set containing exactly one element; its significance lies in its role in the definition of functions and in the formulation of mathematical and logical concepts.
SFIP
Strong finite intersection property
SH
Suslin's hypothesis
Shelah
1. Saharon Shelah
2. A Shelah cardinal is a large cardinal that is the critical point of an elementary embedding satisfying certain conditions
shrewd cardinal
A shrewd cardinal is a type of large cardinal generalizing indecribable cardinals to transfinite levels
Sierpinski
Sierpiński
1. Wacław Sierpiński
2. A Sierpiński set is an uncountable subset of a real vector space whose intersection with every measure-zero set is countable
Silver
1. Jack Silver
2. The Silver indiscernibles form a class I of ordinals such that I ∩ L_{κ} is a set of indiscernibles for L_{κ} for every uncountable cardinal κ
simply infinite set
A term sometimes used for infinite sets, i.e., sets equinumerous with ℕ, to contrast them with Dedekind-infinite sets. In ZF, it can be proved that all Dedekind-infinite sets are simply infinite, but the converse – that all simply infinite sets are Dedekind-infinite – can only be proved in ZFC.
singular
1. A singular cardinal is one that is not regular
2. The singular cardinal hypothesis states that if κ is any singular strong limit cardinal, then 2^{κ} = κ^{+}.
SIS
Semi-intuitionistic system
Skolem
1. Thoralf Skolem
2. Skolem's paradox states that if ZFC is consistent there are countable models of it
3. A Skolem function is a function whose value is something with a given property if anything with that property exists
4. The Skolem hull of a model is its closure under Skolem functions
small
A small large cardinal axiom is a large cardinal axiom consistent with the axiom V=L
SOCA
Semi open coloring axiom
Solovay
1. Robert M. Solovay
2. The Solovay model is a model of ZF in which every set of reals is measurable
special
A special Aronszajn tree is one with an order preserving map to the rationals
square
The square principle is a combinatorial principle holding in the constructible universe and some other inner models
standard model
A model of set theory where the relation ∈ is the same as the usual one.
stationary set
A stationary set is a subset of an ordinal intersecting every club set
stratified
A formula of set theory is stratified if and only if there is a function $\sigma$ which sends each variable appearing in $\phi$ (considered as an item of syntax) to a natural number (this works equally well if all integers are used) in such a way that any atomic formula $x \in y$ appearing in $\phi$ satisfies $\sigma(x)+1 = \sigma(y)$ and any atomic formula $x = y$ appearing in $\phi$ satisfies $\sigma(x) = \sigma(y)$.
strict ordering
An ordering relation that is transitive and irreflexive, implying that no element is considered to be strictly before or after itself, and that the relation holds transitively.
strong
1. The strong finite intersection property says that the intersection of any finite number of elements of a set is infinite
2. A strong cardinal is a cardinal κ such that if λ is any ordinal, there is an elementary embedding with critical point κ from the universe into a transitive inner model containing all elements of V_{λ}
3. A strong limit cardinal is a (usually nonzero) cardinal that is larger than the powerset of any smaller cardinal
strongly
1. A strongly inaccessible cardinal is a regular strong limit cardinal
2. A strongly Mahlo cardinal is a strongly inaccessible cardinal such that the set of strongly inaccessible cardinals below it is stationary
3. A strongly compact cardinal is a cardinal κ such that every κ-complete filter can be extended to a κ complete ultrafilter
subset
A set whose members are all contained within another set, without necessarily being identical to it.
subtle cardinal
A subtle cardinal is a type of large cardinal closely related to ethereal cardinals
successor
1. A successor cardinal is the smallest cardinal larger than some given cardinal
2. A successor ordinal is the smallest ordinal larger than some given ordinal
such that
A condition used in the definition of a mathematical object
sunflower
A sunflower, also called a delta system, is a collection of sets such that any two distinct sets have intersection X for some fixed set X
Souslin
Suslin
1. Mikhail Yakovlevich Suslin (sometimes written Souslin)
2. A Suslin algebra is a Boolean algebra that is complete, atomless, countably distributive, and satisfies the countable chain condition
3. A Suslin cardinal is a cardinal λ such that there exists a set P ⊂ 2^{ω} such that P is λ-Suslin but P is not λ′-Suslin for any λ′ < λ.
4. The Suslin hypothesis says that Suslin lines do not exist
5. A Suslin line is a complete dense unbounded totally ordered set satisfying the countable chain condition
6. The Suslin number is the supremum of the cardinalities of families of disjoint open non-empty sets
7. The Suslin operation, usually denoted by A, is an operation that constructs a set from a Suslin scheme
8. The Suslin problem asks whether Suslin lines exist
9. The Suslin property states that there is no uncountable family of pairwise disjoint non-empty open subsets
10. A Suslin representation of a set of reals is a tree whose projection is that set of reals
11. A Suslin scheme is a function with domain the finite sequences of positive integers
12. A Suslin set is a set that is the image of a tree under a certain projection
13. A Suslin space is the image of a Polish space under a continuous mapping
14. A Suslin subset is a subset that is the image of a tree under a certain projection
15. The Suslin theorem about analytic sets states that a set that is analytic and coanalytic is Borel
16. A Suslin tree is a tree of height ω_{1} such that every branch and every antichain is at most countable.
supercompact
A supercompact cardinal is an uncountable cardinal κ such that for every A such that Card(A) ≥ κ there exists a normal measure over [A]^{κ}.
super transitive
supertransitive
A supertransitive set is a transitive set that contains all subsets of all its elements
symmetric difference
The set operation that yields the elements present in either of two sets but not in their intersection, effectively the elements unique to each set.
symmetric model
A symmetric model is a model of ZF (without the axiom of choice) constructed using a group action on a forcing poset

== T ==
𝔱
The tower number
T
A tree
tall cardinal
A tall cardinal is a type of large cardinal that is the critical point of a certain sort of elementary embedding
Tarski
1. Alfred Tarski
2. Tarski's theorem states that the axiom of choice is equivalent to the existence of a bijection from X to X×X for all infinite sets X
TC
The transitive closure of a set
total order
A total order is a relation that is transitive and antisymmetric such that any two elements are comparable
totally indescribable
A totally indescribable cardinal is a cardinal that is Π^{m}_{n}-indescribable for all m,n
transfinite
1. An infinite ordinal or cardinal number (see Transfinite number)
2. Transfinite induction is induction over ordinals
3. Transfinite recursion is recursion over ordinals
transitive
1. A transitive relation
2. The transitive closure of a set is the smallest transitive set containing it.
3. A transitive set or class is a set or class such that the membership relation is transitive on it.
4. A transitive model is a model of set theory that is transitive and has the usual membership relation
tree
1. A tree is a partially ordered set (T, <) such that for each t ∈ T, the set {s ∈ T : s < t} is well-ordered by the relation <
2. A tree is a collection of finite sequences such that every prefix of a sequence in the collection also belongs to the collection.
3. A cardinal κ has the tree property if there are no κ-Aronszajn trees
tuple
An ordered list of elements, with a fixed number of components, used in mathematics and computer science to describe ordered collections of objects.
Turing recognizable set
A set for which there exists a Turing machine that halts and accepts on any input in the set, but may either halt and reject or run indefinitely on inputs not in the set.
type class
A type class or class of types is the class of all order types of a given cardinality, up to order-equivalence.

== U ==
𝔲
The ultrafilter number, the minimum possible cardinality of an ultrafilter base
Ulam
1. Stanislaw Ulam
2. An Ulam matrix is a collection of subsets of a cardinal indexed by pairs of ordinals, that satisfies certain properties.
Ult
An ultrapower or ultraproduct
ultrafilter
1. A maximal filter
2. The ultrafilter number 𝔲 is the minimum possible cardinality of an ultrafilter base
ultrapower
An ultraproduct in which all factors are equal
ultraproduct
An ultraproduct is the quotient of a product of models by a certain equivalence relation
unfoldable cardinal
An unfoldable cardinal a cardinal κ such that for every ordinal λ and every transitive model M of cardinality κ of ZFC-minus-power set such that κ is in M and M contains all its sequences of length less than κ, there is a non-trivial elementary embedding j of M into a transitive model with the critical point of j being κ and j(κ) ≥ λ.
uniformity
The uniformity non(I) of I is the smallest cardinality of a subset of X not in the ideal I of subsets of X
uniformization
Uniformization is a weak form of the axiom of choice, giving cross sections for special subsets of a product of two Polish spaces
union
An operation in set theory that combines the elements of two or more sets to form a single set containing all the elements of the original sets, without duplication.
universal
universe
1. The universal class, or universe, is the class of all sets.
A universal quantifier is the quantifier "for all", usually written ∀
unordered pair
A set of two elements where the order of the elements does not matter, distinguishing it from an ordered pair where the sequence of elements is significant. The axiom of pairing asserts that for any two objects, the unordered pair containing those objects exists.
upper bound
In mathematics, an element that is greater than or equal to every element of a given set, used in the discussion of intervals, sequences, and functions.
upward Löwenheim–Skolem theorem
A theorem in model theory stating that if a countable first-order theory has an infinite model, then it has models of all larger cardinalities, demonstrating the scalability of models in first-order logic. (See Löwenheim–Skolem theorem)
urelement
An urelement is something that is not a set but allowed to be an element of a set

== V ==
V
V is the universe of all sets, and the sets V_{α} form the Von Neumann hierarchy
V=L
The axiom of constructibility
Veblen
1. Oswald Veblen
2. The Veblen hierarchy is a family of ordinal valued functions, special cases of which are called Veblen functions.
Venn diagram
1. A graphical representation of the logical relationships between sets, using overlapping circles to illustrate intersections, unions, and complements of sets.
von Neumann
1. John von Neumann
2. A von Neumann ordinal is an ordinal encoded as the union of all smaller (von Neumann) ordinals
3. The von Neumann hierarchy is a cumulative hierarchy V_{α} with V_{α+1} the powerset of V_{α}.
Vopenka
Vopěnka
1. Petr Vopěnka
2. Vopěnka's principle states that for every proper class of binary relations there is one elementarily embeddable into another
3. A Vopěnka cardinal is an inaccessible cardinal κ such that and Vopěnka's principle holds for V_{κ}

== W ==
weakly
1. A weakly inaccessible cardinal is a regular weak limit cardinal
2. A weakly compact cardinal is a cardinal κ (usually also assumed to be inaccessible) such that the infinitary language L_{κ,κ} satisfies the weak compactness theorem
3. A weakly Mahlo cardinal is a cardinal κ that is weakly inaccessible and such that the set of weakly inaccessible cardinals less than κ is stationary in κ
well-founded
A relation is called well-founded if every non-empty subset has a minimal element (otherwise it is "non-well-founded")
well-ordering
A well-ordering is a well founded relation, usually also assumed to be a total order
well-ordering principle
that the positive integers are well-ordered, i.e., every non-empty set of positive integers contains a least element
well-ordering theorem
that every set can be well-ordered
Wf
The class of well-founded sets, which is the same as the class of all sets if one assumes the axiom of foundation
Woodin
1. Hugh Woodin
2. A Woodin cardinal is a type of large cardinal that is the critical point of a certain sort of elementary embedding, closely related to the axiom of projective determinacy

== XYZ ==
Z
Zermelo set theory without the axiom of choice
ZC
Zermelo set theory with the axiom of choice
Zermelo
1. Ernst Zermelo
2. Zermelo−Fraenkel set theory is the standard system of axioms for set theory
3. Zermelo set theory is similar to the usual Zermelo-Fraenkel set theory, but without the axioms of replacement and foundation
4. Zermelo's well-ordering theorem states that every set can be well ordered
ZF
Zermelo−Fraenkel set theory without the axiom of choice
ZFA
Zermelo−Fraenkel set theory with atoms
ZFC
Zermelo−Fraenkel set theory with the axiom of choice
zero function
A mathematical function that always returns the value zero, regardless of the input, often used in discussions of functions, calculus, and algebra.
ZF-P
Zermelo−Fraenkel set theory without the axiom of choice or the powerset axiom
Zorn
1. Max Zorn
2. Zorn's lemma states that if every chain of a non-empty poset has an upper bound then the poset has a maximal element

== See also ==
- Glossary of Principia Mathematica
- List of topics in set theory
- Set-builder notation
