= Gamma number =

In mathematics a gamma number may be:

- A value of the gamma function
- An additively indecomposable ordinal
- An ordinal Γ_{α} that is a fixed point of the Veblen hierarchy
