= List of honorary citizens of Reykjavík =

Among the recipients of the honorary citizenship of the City of Reykjavík, Iceland are:

== Honorary Citizens of the City of Reykjavík ==
Date	Name	Notes	Location
1961	Bjarni Jónsson	Icelandic Mathematician and Logician	
1975	Kristján Sveinsson	Icelandic Ophthalmologist	
2010	Vigdís Finnbogadóttir	President of Iceland 1980-1996	
2012	Erró	Icelandic Visual artist and Painter	
9 October 2013	Yoko Ono	Japanese Peace Activist and Wife of John Lennon	
2015	Friðrik Ólafsson	first Icelandic chess grandmaster	
14 January 2024	Björk	Icelandic musician, composer, activist, actress and entrepreneur	
