= Baumgartner's axiom =

In mathematical set theory, Baumgartner's axiom (BA) can be one of three different axioms introduced by James Earl Baumgartner.

A subset of the real line is said to be $\aleph_1$-dense if every two points are separated by exactly $\aleph_1$ other points, where $\aleph_1$ is the smallest uncountable cardinality. This would be true for the real line itself under the continuum hypothesis. An axiom introduced by Baumgartner (1973) states that all $\aleph_1$-dense subsets of the real line are order-isomorphic, providing a higher-cardinality analogue of Cantor's isomorphism theorem that countable dense subsets are isomorphic. Baumgartner's axiom is a consequence of the proper forcing axiom. It is consistent with a combination of ZFC, Martin's axiom, and the negation of the continuum hypothesis, but not implied by those hypotheses.

Another axiom introduced by Baumgartner (1975) states that Martin's axiom for partially ordered sets MA_{P}(κ) is true for all partially ordered sets P that are countable closed, well met and ℵ_{1}-linked and all cardinals κ less than 2^{ℵ_{1}}.

Baumgartner's axiom A is an axiom for partially ordered sets introduced in (Baumgartner 1983, section 7). A partial order (P, ≤) is said to satisfy axiom A if there is a family ≤_{n} of partial orderings on P for n = 0, 1, 2, ... such that

1. ≤_{0} is the same as ≤
2. If p ≤_{n+1}q then p ≤_{n}q
3. If there is a sequence p_{n} with p_{n+1} ≤_{n} p_{n} then there is a q with q ≤_{n} p_{n} for all n.
4. If I is a pairwise incompatible subset of P then for all p and for all natural numbers n there is a q such that q ≤_{n} p and the number of elements of I compatible with q is countable.
