= Ordinal definable set =

Set defined in terms of a finite number of ordinals by a first-order formula

In mathematical set theory, a set S is said to be ordinal definable if, informally, it can be defined in terms of a finite number of ordinals by a first-order formula. Ordinal definable sets were introduced by Gödel (1965).

== Definition ==
A drawback to the above informal definition is that it requires quantification over all first-order formulas, which cannot be formalized in the standard language of set theory. However, there is a different, formal such characterization:

A set S is ordinal definable if there is some collection of ordinals α_{1}, ..., α_{n} and a first-order formula φ taking α_{2}, ..., α_{n} as parameters that uniquely defines $S$ as an element of $V_{\alpha_1}$, i.e., such that S is the unique object validating φ(S, α_{2},...,α_{n}), with its quantifiers ranging over $V_{\alpha_1}$.

The latter denotes the set in the von Neumann hierarchy indexed by the ordinal α_{1}. The class of all ordinal definable sets is denoted OD; it is not necessarily transitive, and need not be a model of ZFC because it might not satisfy the axiom of extensionality.

A set further is hereditarily ordinal definable if it is ordinal definable and all elements of its transitive closure are ordinal definable. The class of hereditarily ordinal definable sets is denoted by HOD, and is a transitive model of ZFC, with a definable well ordering.

It is consistent with the axioms of set theory that all sets are ordinal definable, and so hereditarily ordinal definable. The assertion that this situation holds is referred to as V = OD or V = HOD. It follows from V = L, and is equivalent to the existence of a (definable) well-ordering of the universe. Note however that the formula expressing V = HOD need not hold true within HOD, as it is not absolute for models of set theory: within HOD, the interpretation of the formula for HOD may yield an even smaller inner model.

HOD has been found to be useful in that it is an inner model that can accommodate essentially all known large cardinals. This is in contrast with the situation for core models, as core models have not yet been constructed that can accommodate supercompact cardinals, for example.
