= Fine structure theory =

Fine structure theory may refer to:

- Fine structure, a property in quantum physics
- Fine structure theory, the study of the levels of the Jensen hierarchy of sets in set theory
