= Glossary of Principia Mathematica =

This is a list of the notation used in Alfred North Whitehead and Bertrand Russell's Principia Mathematica (1910–1913).

The second (but not the first) edition of Volume I has a list of notation used at the end.

== Glossary ==
This is a glossary of some of the technical terms in Principia Mathematica that are no longer widely used or whose meaning has changed.

apparent variable
bound variable
atomic proposition
A proposition of the form R(x,y,...) where R is a relation.
Barbara
A mnemonic for a certain syllogism.
class
A subset of the members of some type
codomain
The codomain of a relation R is the class of y such that xRy for some x.
compact
A relation R is called compact if whenever xRz there is a y with xRy and yRz
concordant
A set of real numbers is called concordant if all nonzero members have the same sign
connected
connexity
A relation R is called connected if for any 2 distinct members x, y either xRy or yRx.
continuous
A continuous series is a complete totally ordered set isomorphic to the reals. *275
correlator
bijection
couple
1. A cardinal couple is a class with exactly two elements
2. An ordinal couple is an ordered pair (treated in PM as a special sort of relation)
Dedekindian
complete (relation) *214
definiendum
The symbol being defined
definiens
The meaning of something being defined
derivative
A derivative of a subclass of a series is the class of limits of non-empty subclasses
description
A definition of something as the unique object with a given property
descriptive function
A function taking values that need not be truth values, in other words what is not called just a function.
diversity
The inequality relation
domain
The domain of a relation R is the class of x such that xRy for some y.
elementary proposition
A proposition built from atomic propositions using "or" and "not", but with no bound variables
Epimenides
Epimenides was a legendary Cretan philosopher
existent
non-empty
extensional function
A function whose value does not change if one of its arguments is changed to something equivalent.
field
The field of a relation R is the union of its domain and codomain
first-order
A first-order proposition is allowed to have quantification over individuals but not over things of higher type.
function
This often means a propositional function, in other words a function taking values "true" or "false". If it takes other values it is called a "descriptive function". PM allows two functions to be different even if they take the same values on all arguments.
general proposition
A proposition containing quantifiers
generalization
Quantification over some variables
homogeneous
A relation is called homogeneous if all arguments have the same type.
individual
An element of the lowest type under consideration
inductive
Finite, in the sense that a cardinal is inductive if it can be obtained by repeatedly adding 1 to 0. *120
intensional function
A function that is not extensional.
logical
1. The logical sum of two propositions is their logical disjunction
2. The logical product of two propositions is their logical conjunction
matrix
A function with no bound variables. *12
median
A class is called median for a relation if some element of the class lies strictly between any two terms. *271
member
element (of a class)
molecular proposition
A proposition built from two or more atomic propositions using "or" and "not"; in other words an elementary proposition that is not atomic.
null-class
A class containing no members
predicative
A century of scholarly discussion has not reached a definite consensus on exactly what this means, and Principia Mathematica gives several different explanations of it that are not easy to reconcile. See the introduction and *12. *12 says that a predicative function is one with no apparent (bound) variables, in other words a matrix.
primitive proposition
A proposition assumed without proof
progression
A sequence (indexed by natural numbers)
rational
A rational series is an ordered set isomorphic to the rational numbers
real variable
free variable
referent
The term x in xRy
reflexive
infinite in the sense that the class is in one-to-one correspondence with a proper subset of itself (*124)
relation
A propositional function of some variables (usually two). This is similar to the current meaning of "relation".
relative product
The relative product of two relations is their composition
relatum
The term y in xRy
scope
The scope of an expression is the part of a proposition where the expression has some given meaning (chapter III)
Scott
Sir Walter Scott, author of Waverley.
second-order
A second order function is one that may have first-order arguments
section
A section of a total order is a subclass containing all predecessors of its members.
segment
A subclass of a totally ordered set consisting of all the predecessors of the members of some class
selection
A choice function: something that selects one element from each of a collection of classes.
sequent
A sequent of a class α in a totally ordered class is a minimal element of the class of terms coming after all members of α. (*206)
serial relation
A total order on a class
significant
well-defined or meaningful
similar
of the same cardinality
stretch
A convex subclass of an ordered class
stroke
The Sheffer stroke (only used in the second edition of PM)
type
As in type theory. All objects belong to one of a number of disjoint types.
typically
Relating to types; for example, "typically ambiguous" means "of ambiguous type".
unit
A unit class is one that contains exactly one element
universal
A universal class is one containing all members of some type
vector
1. Essentially an injective function from a class to itself (for example, a vector in a vector space acting on an affine space)
2. A vector-family is a non-empty commuting family of injective functions from some class to itself (VIB)

== Symbols introduced in Principia Mathematica, Volume I ==
Symbol	Approximate meaning	Reference
✸	Indicates that the following number is a reference to some proposition	
α,β,γ,δ,λ,κ, μ	Classes	Chapter I page 5
f,g,θ,φ,χ,ψ	Variable functions (though θ is later redefined as the order type of the reals)	Chapter I page 5
a,b,c,w,x,y,z	Variables	Chapter I page 5
p,q,r	Variable propositions (though the meaning of p changes after section 40).	Chapter I page 5
P,Q,R,S,T,U	Relations	Chapter I page 5
. : :. ::	Dots used to indicate how expressions should be bracketed, and also used for logical "and".	Chapter I, Page 10
$\hat x$	Indicates (roughly) that x is a bound variable used to define a function. Can also mean (roughly) "the set of x such that...".	Chapter I, page 15
!	Indicates that a function preceding it is first order	Chapter II.V
⊦	Assertion: it is true that	*1(3)
~	Not	*1(5)
∨	Or	*1(6)
⊃	(A modification of Peano's symbol Ɔ.) Implies	*1.01
=	Equality	*1.01
Df	Definition	*1.01
Pp	Primitive proposition	*1.1
Dem.	Short for "Demonstration"	*2.01
.	Logical and	*3.01
p⊃q⊃r	p⊃q and q⊃r	*3.02
≡	Is equivalent to	*4.01
p≡q≡r	p≡q and q≡r	*4.02
Hp	Short for "Hypothesis"	*5.71
(x)	For all x This may also be used with several variables as in 11.01.	*9
(∃x)	There exists an x such that. This may also be used with several variables as in 11.03.	*9, *10.01
≡_{x}, ⊃_{x}	The subscript x is an abbreviation meaning that the equivalence or implication holds for all x. This may also be used with several variables.	*10.02, *10.03, *11.05.
=	x=y means x is identical with y in the sense that they have the same properties	*13.01
≠	Not identical	*13.02
x=y=z	x=y and y=z	*13.3
℩	This is an upside-down iota (unicode U+2129). ℩x means roughly "the unique x such that...."	*14
[]	The scope indicator for definite descriptions.	*14.01
E!	There exists a unique...	*14.02
ε	A Greek epsilon, abbreviating the Greek word ἐστί meaning "is". It is used to mean "is a member of" or "is a"	*20.02 and Chapter I page 26
Cls	Short for "Class". The 2-class of all classes	*20.03
,	Abbreviation used when several variables have the same property	*20.04, *20.05
~ε	Is not a member of	*20.06
Prop	Short for "Proposition" (usually the proposition that one is trying to prove).	Note before *2.17
Rel	The class of relations	*21.03
⊂ ⪽	Is a subset of (with a dot for relations)	*22.01, *23.01
∩ ⩀	Intersection (with a dot for relations). α∩β∩γ is defined to be (α∩β)∩γ and so on.	*22.02, *22.53, *23.02, *23.53
∪ ⨄	Union (with a dot for relations) α∪β∪γ is defined to be (α∪β)∪γ and so on.	22.03, *22.71, *23.03, *23.71
− ∸	Complement of a class or difference of two classes (with a dot for relations)	*22.04, *22.05, *23.04, *23.05
V ⩒	The universal class (with a dot for relations)	*24.01
Λ ⩑	The null or empty class (with a dot for relations)	24.02
∃!	The following class is non-empty	*24.03
‘	R ‘ y means the unique x such that xRy	*30.01
Cnv	Short for converse. The converse relation between relations	*31.01
Ř	The converse of a relation R	*31.02
$\overrightarrow{ R}$	A relation such that $x\overrightarrow{ R}z$ if x is the set of all y such that $y\overrightarrow{ R}z$	*32.01
$\overleftarrow{ R}$	Similar to $\overrightarrow{ R}$ with the left and right arguments reversed	*32.02
sg	Short for "sagitta" (Latin for arrow). The relation between $\overrightarrow{ R}$ and R.	*32.03
gs	Reversal of sg. The relation between $\overleftarrow{ R}$ and R.	32.04
D	Domain of a relation (αDR means α is the domain of R).	*33.01
D	(Upside down D) Codomain of a relation	*33.02
C	(Initial letter of the word "campus", Latin for "field".) The field of a relation, the union of its domain and codomain	*32.03
F	The relation indicating that something is in the field of a relation	*32.04
$|$	The composition of two relations. Also used for the Sheffer stroke in *8 appendix A of the second edition.	*34.01
R^{2}, R^{3}	R^{n} is the composition of R with itself n times.	*34.02, *34.03
$\upharpoonleft$	$\alpha\upharpoonleft R$ is the relation R with its domain restricted to α	*35.01
$\upharpoonright$	$R\upharpoonright \alpha$ is the relation R with its codomain restricted to α	*35.02
$\uparrow$	Roughly a product of two sets, or rather the corresponding relation	*35.04
⥏	P⥏α means $\alpha\upharpoonleft P \upharpoonright\alpha$. The symbol is unicode U+294F	*36.01
“	(Double open quotation marks.) R“α is the domain of a relation R restricted to a class α	*37.01
R_{ε}	αR_{ε}β means "α is the domain of R restricted to β"	*37.02
‘‘‘	(Triple open quotation marks.) αR‘‘‘κ means "α is the domain of R restricted to some element of κ"	*37.04
E!!	Means roughly that a relation is a function when restricted to a certain class	*37.05
♀	A generic symbol standing for any functional sign or relation	*38
”	Double closing quotation mark placed below a function of 2 variables changes it to a related class-valued function.	*38.03
p	The intersection of the classes in a class. (The meaning of p changes here: before section 40 p is a propositional variable.)	*40.01
s	The union of the classes in a class	*40.02
$||$	$R||S$ applies R to the left and S to the right of a relation	*43.01
I	The equality relation	*50.01
J	The inequality relation	*50.02
ι	Greek iota. Takes a class x to the class whose only element is x.	*51.01
1	The class of classes with one element	*52.01
0	The class whose only element is the empty class. With a subscript r it is the class containing the empty relation.	*54.01, *56.03
2	The class of classes with two elements. With a dot over it, it is the class of ordered pairs. With the subscript r it is the class of unequal ordered pairs.	*54.02, *56.01, *56.02
$\downarrow$	An ordered pair	*55.01
Cl	Short for "class". The powerset relation	*60.01
Cl ex	The relation saying that one class is the set of non-empty classes of another	*60.02
Cls^{2}, Cls^{3}	The class of classes, and the class of classes of classes	*60.03, *60.04
Rl	Same as Cl, but for relations rather than classes	*61.01, *61.02, *61.03, *61.04
ε	The membership relation	*62.01
t	The type of something, in other words the largest class containing it. t may also have further subscripts and superscripts.	*63.01, *64
t_{0}	The type of the members of something	*63.02
α_{x}	the elements of α with the same type as x	*65.01 *65.03
α(x)	The elements of α with the type of the type of x.	*65.02 *65.04
→	α→β is the class of relations such that the domain of any element is in α and the codomain is in β.	*70.01
s̅m̅	Short for "similar". The class of bijections between two classes	*73.01
sm	Similarity: the relation that two classes have a bijection between them	*73.02
P_{Δ}	λP_{Δ}κ means that λ is a selection function for P restricted to κ	*80.01
excl	Refers to various classes being disjoint	*84
↧	P↧x is the subrelation of P of ordered pairs in P whose second term is x.	*85.5
Rel Mult	The class of multipliable relations	*88.01
Cls^{2} Mult	The multipliable classes of classes	*88.02
Mult ax	The multiplicative axiom, a form of the axiom of choice	*88.03
R_{*}	The transitive closure of the relation R	*90.01
R_{st}, R_{ts}	Relations saying that one relation is a positive power of R times another	*91.01, *91.02
Pot	(Short for the Latin word "potentia" meaning power.) The positive powers of a relation	*91.03
Potid	("Pot" for "potentia" + "id" for "identity".) The positive or zero powers of a relation	*91.04
R_{po}	The union of the positive power of R	*91.05
B	Stands for "Begins". Something is in the domain but not the range of a relation	*93.01
min, max	used to mean that something is a minimal or maximal element of some class with respect to some relation	*93.02 *93.021
gen	The generations of a relation	*93.03
✸	P✸Q is a relation corresponding to the operation of applying P to the left and Q to the right of a relation. This meaning is only used in *95 and the symbol is defined differently in *257.	*95.01
Dft	Temporary definition (followed by the section it is used in).	*95 footnote
I_{R},J_{R}	Certain subsets of the images of an element under repeatedly applying a function R. Only used in *96.	*96.01, *96.02
$\overleftrightarrow{R}$	The class of ancestors and descendants of an element under a relation R	*97.01

== Symbols introduced in Principia Mathematica, Volume II ==
Symbol	Approximate meaning	Reference
Nc	The cardinal number of a class	*100.01,*103.01
NC	The class of cardinal numbers	*100.02, *102.01, *103.02,*104.02
μ^{(1)}	For a cardinal μ, this is the same cardinal in the next higher type.	*104.03
μ_{(1)}	For a cardinal μ, this is the same cardinal in the next lower type.	*105.03
+	The disjoint union of two classes	*110.01
+_{c}	The sum of two cardinals	*110.02
Crp	Short for "correspondence".	*110.02
ς	(A Greek sigma used at the end of a word.) The series of segments of a series; essentially the completion of a totally ordered set	*212.01

== Symbols introduced in Principia Mathematica, Volume III ==
Symbol	Approximate meaning	Reference
Bord	Abbreviation of "bene ordinata" (Latin for "well-ordered"), the class of well-founded relations	*250.01
Ω	The class of well ordered relations	250.02

== See also ==
- Glossary of set theory
