= Open coloring axiom =

The open coloring axiom (abbreviated OCA) is an axiom about coloring edges of a graph whose vertices are a subset of the real numbers: two different versions were introduced by Abraham, Rubin & Shelah (1985) and by Todorčević (1989).

== Statement ==
Suppose that X is a subset of the reals, and each pair of elements of X is colored either black or white, with the set of white pairs being open in the complete graph on X. The open coloring axiom states that either:

1. X has an uncountable subset such that any pair from this subset is white; or
2. X can be partitioned into a countable number of subsets such that any pair from the same subset is black.

A weaker version, OCA_{P}, replaces the uncountability condition in the first case with being a compact perfect set in X. Both OCA and OCA_{P} can be stated equivalently for arbitrary separable spaces.

== Relation to other axioms ==
OCA_{P} can be proved in ZFC for analytic subsets of a Polish space, and from the axiom of determinacy. The full OCA is consistent with (but independent of) ZFC, and follows from the proper forcing axiom.

OCA implies that the smallest unbounded set of Baire space has cardinality $\aleph_2$. Moreover, assuming OCA, Baire space contains few "gaps" between sets of sequences — more specifically, that the only possible gaps are (ω_{1},ω_{1})-gaps and (κ,ω)-gaps where κ is an initial ordinal not less than ω_{2}.
