= Sierpiński's theorem on metric spaces =

In mathematics, Sierpiński's theorem is an isomorphism theorem concerning certain metric spaces, named after Wacław Sierpiński who proved it in 1920.

It states that any countable metric space without isolated points is homeomorphic to $\mathbb{Q}$ (with its standard topology).

== Examples ==
As a consequence of the theorem, the metric space $\mathbb{Q}^2$ (with its usual Euclidean distance) is homeomorphic to $\mathbb{Q}$, which may seem counterintuitive. This is in contrast to, e.g., $\mathbb{R}^2$, which is not homeomorphic to $\mathbb{R}$. As another example, $\mathbb{Q} \cap [0, 1]$ is also homeomorphic to $\mathbb{Q}$, again in contrast to the closed real interval $[0, 1]$, which is not homeomorphic to $\mathbb{R}$ (whereas the open interval $(0, 1)$ is).

== See also ==
- Cantor's isomorphism theorem is an analogous statement on linear orders.
