= Solovay model =

Set theory construction

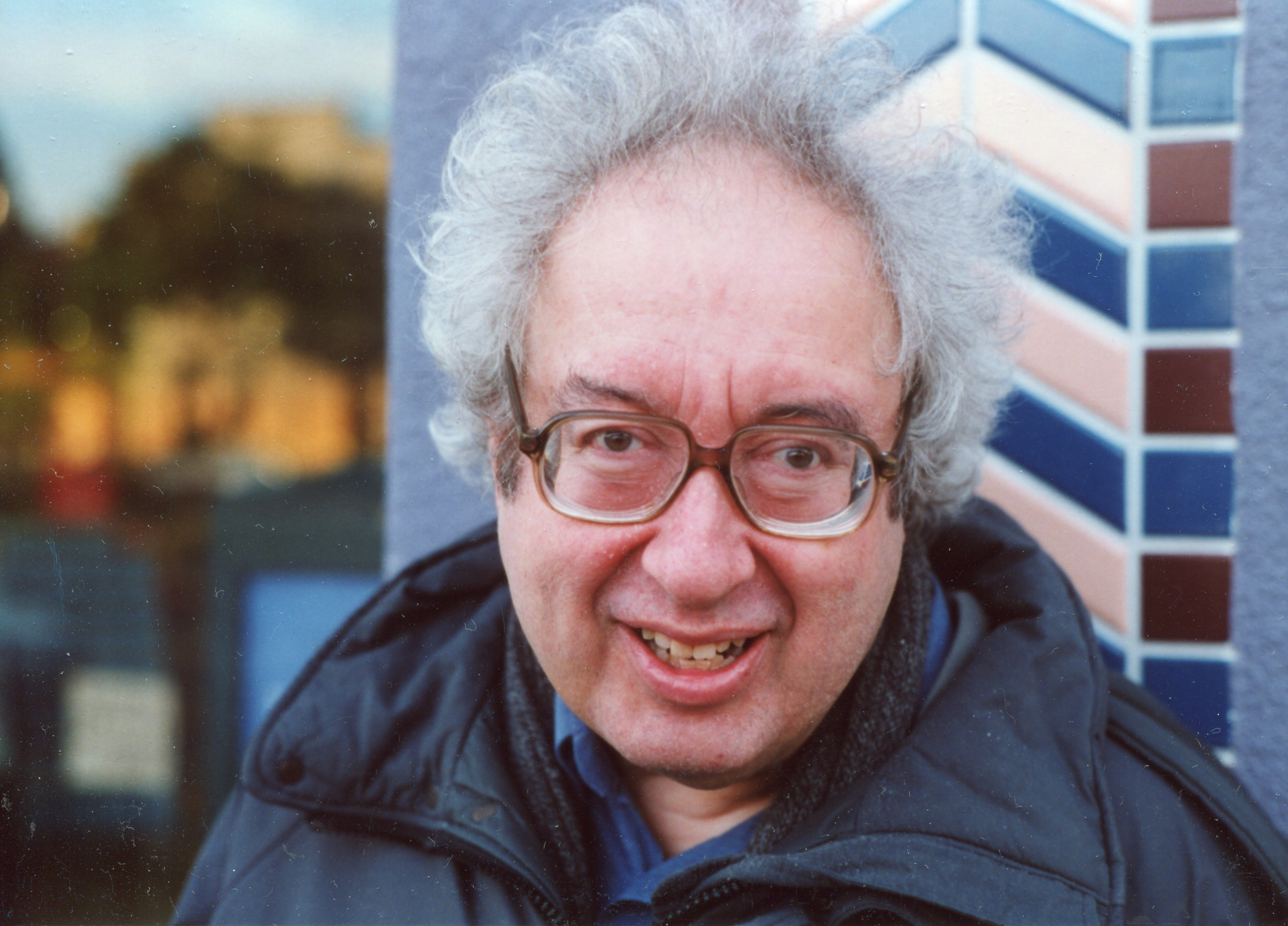
Robert M. Solovay in Berkeley, California in 2004

In the mathematical field of set theory, the Solovay model is a model constructed by Robert M. Solovay in which all of the axioms of Zermelo–Fraenkel set theory (ZF) hold, exclusive of the axiom of choice, but in which all sets of real numbers are Lebesgue measurable. The construction relies on the existence of an inaccessible cardinal.

In this way, Solovay showed that in the proof of the existence of a non-measurable set from ZFC (Zermelo–Fraenkel set theory plus the axiom of choice), the axiom of choice is essential, at least granted that the existence of an inaccessible cardinal is consistent with ZFC.

== Statement ==
ZF stands for Zermelo–Fraenkel set theory, and DC for the axiom of dependent choice.

Solovay's theorem is as follows. Assuming the existence of an inaccessible cardinal, there is an inner model of ZF + DC of a suitable forcing extension V[G] such that every set of reals is Lebesgue measurable, has the perfect set property, and has the Baire property.

== Construction ==
Solovay constructed his model in two steps, starting with a model M of ZFC containing an inaccessible cardinal κ.

The first step is to take a Levy collapse M[G] of M by adding a generic set G for the notion of forcing that collapses all cardinals less than κ to ω. Then M[G] is a model of ZFC with the property that every set of reals that is definable over a countable sequence of ordinals is Lebesgue measurable, and has the Baire and perfect set properties. (This includes all definable and projective sets of reals; however for reasons related to Tarski's undefinability theorem the notion of a definable set of reals cannot be defined in the language of set theory, while the notion of a set of reals definable over a countable sequence of ordinals can be.)

The second step is to construct Solovay's model N as the class of all sets in M[G] that are hereditarily definable over a countable sequence of ordinals. The model N is an inner model of M[G] satisfying ZF + DC such that every set of reals is Lebesgue measurable, has the perfect set property, and has the Baire property. The proof of this uses the fact that every real in M[G] is definable over a countable sequence of ordinals, and hence N and M[G] have the same reals.

Instead of using Solovay's model N, one can also use the smaller inner model L(R) of M[G], consisting of the constructible closure of the real numbers, which has similar properties.

== Complements ==
Solovay suggested in his paper that the use of an inaccessible cardinal might not be necessary. Several authors proved weaker versions of Solovay's result without assuming the existence of an inaccessible cardinal. In particular Krivine (1969) showed there was a model of ZFC in which every ordinal-definable set of reals is measurable, Solovay showed there is a model of ZF + DC in which there is some translation-invariant extension of Lebesgue measure to all subsets of the reals, and Shelah (1984) showed that there is a model in which all sets of reals have the Baire property (so that the inaccessible cardinal is indeed unnecessary in this case).

The case of the perfect set property was solved by Specker (1957), who showed (in ZF) that if every set of reals has the perfect set property and the first uncountable cardinal ℵ_{1} is regular, then ℵ_{1} is inaccessible in the constructible universe. Combined with Solovay's result, this shows that the statements "There is an inaccessible cardinal" and "ℵ_{1} is regular + Every set of reals has the perfect set property" are equiconsistent over ZF.^{p. 371}

Finally, Shelah (1984) showed that consistency of an inaccessible cardinal is also necessary for constructing a model in which all sets of reals are Lebesgue measurable. More precisely he showed that if every Σ^{1}_{3} set of reals is measurable then the first uncountable cardinal ℵ_{1} is inaccessible in the constructible universe, so that the condition about an inaccessible cardinal cannot be dropped from Solovay's theorem. Shelah also showed that the Σ^{1}_{3} condition is close to the best possible by constructing a model (without using an inaccessible cardinal) in which all Δ^{1}_{3} sets of reals are measurable. See Raisonnier (1984), Stern (1985) and Miller (1989) for expositions of Shelah's result.

Shelah & Woodin (1990) showed that if supercompact cardinals exist then every set of reals in L(R), the constructible sets generated by the reals, is Lebesgue measurable and has the Baire property; this includes every "reasonably definable" set of reals. Later it was shown that the usage of a supercompact cardinal could be significantly weakened, to only infinitely many Woodin cardinals with a measurable cardinal above them all.
