= Dmitry Matveyevich Smirnov =

20th century Soviet mathematician

Dmitry Matveyevich Smirnov (Russian: Дмитрий Матвеевич Смирнов; 27 October 1919 in Shilovo, Seredskii District, Ivanovo Oblast, Soviet Union – 14 April 2005) was a Soviet mathematician working in group theory and Jónsson–Tarski algebras.

== Bibliography ==
- "Dmitrii Matveevich Smirnov (on his fiftieth birthday)" (PDF), Algebra i Logika, 8 (4): 493–496, 1969
- Volʹbot, A. D.; Goncharov, S. S.; Gorbuno, V. A. (1989), "Dmitriĭ Matveevich Smirnov (on the occasion of his seventieth birthday)", Algebra i Logika, 28 (5): 491–492, MR 1087567
- Dmitry Matveyevich Smirnov at the Mathematics Genealogy Project
