= Jónsson–Tarski algebra =

In mathematics, a Jónsson–Tarski algebra or Cantor algebra is an algebraic structure encoding a bijection from an infinite set X onto the product X×X. They were introduced by Bjarni Jónsson and Alfred Tarski (1961, Theorem 5). Smirnov (1971), named them after Georg Cantor because of Cantor's pairing function and Cantor's theorem that an infinite set X has the same number of elements as X×X. The term Cantor algebra is also occasionally used to mean the Boolean algebra of all clopen subsets of the Cantor set, or the Boolean algebra of Borel subsets of the reals modulo meager sets (sometimes called the Cohen algebra).

The group of order-preserving automorphisms of the free Jónsson–Tarski algebra on one generator is the Thompson group F.

== Definition ==
A Jónsson–Tarski algebra of type 2 is a set A with a product w from A×A to A and two 'projection' maps p_{1} and p_{2} from A to A, satisfying p_{1}(w(a_{1},a_{2})) = a_{1}, p_{2}(w(a_{1},a_{2})) = a_{2}, and w(p_{1}(a),p_{2}(a)) = a. The definition for type > 2 is similar but with n projection operators.

== Example ==
If w is any bijection from A×A to A then it can be extended to a unique Jónsson–Tarski algebra by letting p_{i}(a) be the projection of w^{−1}(a) onto the ith factor.
