= Jónsson term =

In universal algebra, within mathematics, a majority term, sometimes called a Jónsson term, is a term t with exactly three free variables that satisfies the equations t(x, x, y) = t(x, y, x) = t(y, x, x) = x.

For example, for lattices, the term (x ∧ y) ∨ (y ∧ z) ∨ (z ∧ x) is a Jónsson term.

== Sequences of Jónsson terms ==
In general, Jónsson terms, more formally, a sequence of Jónsson terms, is a sequence of ternary terms satisfying certain related identities. Being one of the earliest discovered Maltsev conditions, a variety is congruence distributive if and only if it has a sequence of Jónsson terms.

The case of a majority term is given by the special case n=2 of a sequence of Jónsson terms.

Jónsson terms are named after the Icelandic mathematician Bjarni Jónsson.
