= Lévy hierarchy =

Hierarchy of formulas in set theory

In set theory and mathematical logic, the Lévy hierarchy, introduced by Azriel Lévy in 1965, is a hierarchy of formulas in the formal language of the Zermelo–Fraenkel set theory (ZFC), which is typically called just the language of set theory. This is analogous to the arithmetical hierarchy, which provides a similar classification for sentences of the language of arithmetic.

== Definitions ==
In the language of set theory, atomic formulas are of the form x = y or x ∈ y, standing for equality and set membership predicates, respectively.

The first level of the Lévy hierarchy is defined as containing only formulas with no unbounded quantifiers and is denoted by $\Delta_0=\Sigma_0=\Pi_0$. The next levels are given by finding a formula in prenex normal form that is provably equivalent over ZFC, and counting the number of alternations of quantifiers:^{p. 184}

A formula $A$ is called:

- $\Sigma_{i+1}$ if $A$ is equivalent to $\exists x_1 ... \exists x_n B$ in ZFC, where $B$ is $\Pi_i$
- $\Pi_{i+1}$ if $A$ is equivalent to $\forall x_1 ... \forall x_n B$ in ZFC, where $B$ is $\Sigma_i$
- If a formula is both $\Sigma_i$ and $\Pi_i$ form, it is called $\Delta_i$.

As a formula might have several different equivalent formulas in prenex normal form, it might belong to several different levels of the hierarchy. In this case, the lowest possible level is the level of the formula.

Lévy's original notation was $\Sigma_i^\mathsf{ZFC}$ (respectively $\Pi_i^\mathsf{ZFC}$) due to the provable logical equivalence, strictly speaking the above levels should be referred to as $\Sigma_i^\mathsf{ZFC}$ (respectively $\Pi_i^\mathsf{ZFC}$) to specify the theory in which the equivalence is carried out, however it is usually clear from context.^{pp. 441–442} Pohlers has defined $\Delta_1$ in particular semantically, in which a formula is "$\Delta_1$ in a structure $M$".

The Lévy hierarchy is sometimes defined for other theories S. In this case $\Sigma_i$ and $\Pi_i$ by themselves refer only to formulas that start with a sequence of quantifiers with at most i−1 alternations, and $\Sigma_i^S$ and $\Pi_i^S$ refer to formulas equivalent to $\Sigma_i$ and $\Pi_i$ formulas in the language of the theory S. So strictly speaking the levels $\Sigma_i$ and $\Pi_i$ of the Lévy hierarchy for ZFC defined above should be denoted by $\Sigma^{\mathsf{ZFC}} _i$ and $\Pi^{\mathsf{ZFC}}_i$.

== Examples ==
=== Σ_{0}=Π_{0}=Δ_{0} formulas and concepts ===
- x = {y, z}^{p. 14}
- x ⊆ y
- x is a transitive set
- x is an ordinal, x is a limit ordinal, x is a successor ordinal
- x is a finite ordinal
- The first infinite ordinal ω
- x is an ordered pair. The first entry of the ordered pair x is a. The second entry of the ordered pair x is b ^{p. 14}
- f is a function. x is the domain/range of the function f. y is the value of f on x ^{p. 14}
- The Cartesian product of two sets.
- x is the union of y
- x is a member of the αth level of Gödel's L
- R is a relation with domain/range/field a ^{p. 14}
- X is Hausdorff.

=== Δ_{1}-formulas and concepts ===
- x is a well-founded relation on y
- x is finite ^{p.15}
- Ordinal addition and multiplication and exponentiation
- x has rank α
- The rank (with respect to Gödel's constructible universe) of a set ^{p. 61}
- The transitive closure of a set.
- The specifiability relation Sp(A) for a set A.

=== Σ_{1}-formulas and concepts ===
- x is countable.
- |X|≤|Y|, |X|=|Y|.
- x is constructible.
- g is the restriction of the function f to a ^{p. 23}
- g is the image of f on a ^{p. 23}
- b is the successor ordinal of a ^{p. 23}
- The Mostowski collapse of $(x,\in)$^{p. 29}

=== Π_{1}-formulas and concepts ===
- x is a cardinal
- x is a regular cardinal
- x is a limit cardinal
- x is an inaccessible cardinal.
- x is the powerset of y
- x is $V_{\alpha}$

=== Δ_{2}-formulas and concepts ===
- κ is γ-supercompact

=== Σ_{2}-formulas and concepts ===
- the continuum hypothesis
- there exists an inaccessible cardinal
- there exists a measurable cardinal
- κ is an n-huge cardinal

=== Π_{2}-formulas and concepts ===
- The axiom of choice
- The generalized continuum hypothesis
- The axiom of constructibility: V = L

=== Δ_{3}-formulas and concepts ===
- κ is an measurable cardinal

=== Σ_{3}-formulas and concepts ===
- there exists a supercompact cardinal

=== Π_{3}-formulas and concepts ===
- κ is an extendible cardinal

=== Σ_{4}-formulas and concepts ===
- there exists an extendible cardinal

== Properties ==
Let $n\geq 1$. The Lévy hierarchy has the following properties:^{p. 184}

- If $\phi$ is $\Sigma_n$, then $\lnot\phi$ is $\Pi_n$.
- If $\phi$ is $\Pi_n$, then $\lnot\phi$ is $\Sigma_n$.
- If $\phi$ and $\psi$ are $\Sigma_n$, then $\exists x\phi$, $\phi\land\psi$, $\phi\lor\psi$, $\exists(x\in z)\phi$, and $\forall(x\in z)\phi$ are all $\Sigma_n$.
- If $\phi$ and $\psi$ are $\Pi_n$, then $\forall x\phi$, $\phi\land\psi$, $\phi\lor\psi$, $\exists(x\in z)\phi$, and $\forall(x\in z)\phi$ are all $\Pi_n$.
- If $\phi$ is $\Sigma_n$ and $\psi$ is $\Pi_n$, then $\phi\implies\psi$ is $\Pi_n$.
- If $\phi$ is $\Pi_n$ and $\psi$ is $\Sigma_n$, then $\phi\implies\psi$ is $\Sigma_n$.

Devlin p. 29

== See also ==
- Arithmetic hierarchy
- Absoluteness
