= Martin's maximum =

In set theory, a branch of mathematical logic, Martin's maximum, introduced by Foreman, Magidor & Shelah (1988) and named after Donald Martin, is a stronger form of the proper forcing axiom, itself a stronger form of Martin's axiom. It represents the broadest class of forcings for which a forcing axiom is consistent.

Martin's maximum $(\operatorname{MM})$ states that if D is a collection of $\aleph_1$ dense subsets of a notion of forcing that preserves stationary subsets of ω_{1}, then there is a D-generic filter. Forcing with a ccc notion of forcing preserves stationary subsets of ω_{1}, thus $\operatorname{MM}$ extends $\operatorname{MA}(\aleph_1)$. If (P,≤) is not a stationary set preserving notion of forcing, i.e., there is a stationary subset of ω_{1}, which becomes nonstationary when forcing with (P,≤), then there is a collection D of $\aleph_1$ dense subsets of (P,≤), such that there is no D-generic filter. This is why $\operatorname{MM}$ is called the maximal extension of Martin's axiom.

The existence of a supercompact cardinal implies the consistency of Martin's maximum. The proof uses Shelah's theories of semiproper forcing and iteration with revised countable supports.

$\operatorname{MM}$ implies that the value of the continuum is $\aleph_2$ and that the ideal of nonstationary sets on ω_{1} is $\aleph_2$-saturated. It further implies stationary reflection, i.e., if S is a stationary subset of some regular cardinal κ ≥ ω_{2} and every element of S has countable cofinality, then there is an ordinal α < κ such that S ∩ α is stationary in α. In fact, S contains a closed subset of order type ω_{1}.

== See also ==
- Transfinite number
