= Jensen hierarchy =

Concept in mathematics

In set theory, a mathematical discipline, the Jensen hierarchy or J-hierarchy is a modification of Gödel's constructible hierarchy, L, that circumvents certain technical difficulties that exist in the constructible hierarchy. The J-Hierarchy figures prominently in fine structure theory, a field pioneered by Ronald Jensen, for whom the Jensen hierarchy is named. Rudimentary functions describe a method for iterating through the Jensen hierarchy.

== Definition ==
As in the definition of L, let Def(X) be the collection of sets definable with parameters over X:

$$\textrm{Def}(X) := \{ \{y \in X \mid \Phi(y,z_1,...,z_n) \text{ is true in } (X,\in)\} \mid \Phi \text{ is a first order formula}, z_1, ..., z_n\in X\}$$

The constructible hierarchy, $L$ is defined by transfinite recursion. In particular, at successor ordinals, $L_{\alpha+1} = \textrm{Def}(L_\alpha)$.

The difficulty with this construction is that each of the levels is not closed under the formation of unordered pairs; for a given $x, y \in L_{\alpha+1} \setminus L_\alpha$, the set $\{x,y\}$ will not be an element of $L_{\alpha+1}$, since it is not a subset of $L_\alpha$.

However, $L_\alpha$ does have the desirable property of being closed under Σ_{0} separation.

Jensen's modification of the L hierarchy retains this property and the slightly weaker condition that $J_{\alpha+1} \cap \mathcal P(J_{\alpha}) = \textrm{Def}(J_{\alpha})$, but is also closed under pairing. The key technique is to encode hereditarily definable sets over $J_\alpha$ by codes; then $J_{\alpha+1}$ will contain all sets whose codes are in $J_\alpha$.

Like $L_\alpha$, $J_\alpha$ is defined recursively. For each ordinal $\alpha$, we define $W^{\alpha}_n$ to be a universal $\Sigma_n$ predicate for $J_\alpha$. We encode hereditarily definable sets as $X_{\alpha}(n+1, e) = \{X_\alpha(n, f) \mid W^{\alpha}_{n+1}(e, f)\}$, with $X_{\alpha}(0, e) = e$. Then set $J_{\alpha,n} := \{X_\alpha(n, e) \mid e \in J_\alpha\}$ and finally, $J_{\alpha+1} := \bigcup_{n \in \omega} J_{\alpha, n}$.

== Properties ==
Each sublevel J_{α, n} is transitive and contains all ordinals less than or equal to ωα + n. The sequence of sublevels is strictly ⊆-increasing in n, since a Σ_{m} predicate is also Σ_{n} for any n > m. The levels J_{α} will thus be transitive and strictly ⊆-increasing as well, and are also closed under pairing, $\Delta_0$-comprehension and transitive closure. Moreover, they have the property that

$$J_{\alpha+1} \cap \mathcal P(J_\alpha) = \text{Def}(J_\alpha),$$

as desired. (Or a bit more generally, $L_{\omega+\alpha}=J_{1+\alpha}\cap V_{\omega+\alpha}$.)

The levels and sublevels are themselves Σ_{1} uniformly definable (i.e. the definition of J_{α, n} in J_{β} does not depend on β), and have a uniform Σ_{1} well-ordering. Also, the levels of the Jensen hierarchy satisfy a condensation lemma much like the levels of Gödel's original hierarchy.

For any $J_\alpha$, considering any $\Sigma_n$ relation on $J_\alpha$, there is a Skolem function for that relation that is itself definable by a $\Sigma_n$ formula.

== Rudimentary functions ==
A rudimentary function is a V^{n}→V function (i.e. a finitary function accepting sets as arguments) that can be obtained from the following operations:

- F(x_{1}, x_{2}, ...) = x_{i} is rudimentary (see projection function)
- F(x_{1}, x_{2}, ...) = {x_{i}, x_{j}} is rudimentary
- F(x_{1}, x_{2}, ...) = x_{i} − x_{j} is rudimentary
- Any composition of rudimentary functions is rudimentary
- ∪_{z∈y}G(z, x_{1}, x_{2}, ...) is rudimentary, where G is a rudimentary function

For any set M let rud(M) be the smallest set containing M∪{M} closed under the rudimentary functions. Then the Jensen hierarchy satisfies J_{α+1} = rud(J_{α}).

== Projecta ==
Jensen defines $\rho_\alpha^n$, the $\Sigma_n$ projectum of $\alpha$, as the largest $\beta\leq\alpha$ such that $(J_\beta,A)$ is amenable for all $A\in\Sigma_n(J_\alpha)\cap\mathcal P(J_\beta)$, and the $\Delta_n$ projectum of $\alpha$ is defined similarly. One of the main results of fine structure theory is that $\rho_\alpha^n$ is also the largest $\gamma$ such that not every $\Sigma_n(J_\alpha)$ subset of $\omega\gamma$ is (in the terminology of α-recursion theory) $\alpha$-finite.

Lerman defines the $S_n$ projectum of $\alpha$ to be the largest $\gamma$ such that not every $S_n$ subset of $\beta$ is $\alpha$-finite, where a set is $S_n$ if it is the image of a function $f(x)$ expressible as $\lim_{y_1}\lim_{y_2}\ldots\lim_{y_n}g(x,y_1,y_2,\ldots,y_n)$ where $g$ is $\alpha$-recursive. In a Jensen-style characterization, $S_3$ projectum of $\alpha$ is the largest $\beta\leq\alpha$ such that there is an $S_3$ epimorphism from $\beta$ onto $\alpha$. There exists an ordinal $\alpha$ whose $\Delta_3$ projectum is $\omega$, but whose $S_n$ projectum is $\alpha$ for all natural $n$.
