= Jónsson function =

In mathematical set theory, an ω-Jónsson function for a set x of ordinals is a function $f:[x]^\omega\to x$ with the property that, for any subset y of x with the same cardinality as x, the restriction of $f$ to $[y]^\omega$ is surjective on $x$. Here $[x]^\omega$ denotes the set of strictly increasing sequences of members of $x$, or equivalently the family of subsets of $x$ with order type $\omega$, using a standard notation for the family of subsets with a given order type. Jónsson functions are named for Bjarni Jónsson.

Erdős and Hajnal (1966) showed that for every ordinal λ there is an ω-Jónsson function for λ.

Kunen's proof of Kunen's inconsistency theorem uses a Jónsson function for cardinals λ such that 2^{λ} = λ^{ℵ_{0}}, and Kunen observed that for this special case there is a simpler proof of the existence of Jónsson functions. Galvin and Prikry (1976) gave a simple proof for the general case.

The existence of Jónsson functions shows that for any cardinal there is an algebra with an infinitary operation that has no proper subalgebras of the same cardinality. In particular if infinitary operations are allowed then an analogue of Jónsson algebras exists in any cardinality, so there are no infinitary analogues of Jónsson cardinals.
