= Suslin algebra =

In mathematics, a Suslin algebra is a Boolean algebra that is complete, atomless, countably distributive, and satisfies the countable chain condition. They are named after Mikhail Yakovlevich Suslin.

The existence of Suslin algebras is independent of the axioms of ZFC, and is equivalent to the existence of Suslin trees or Suslin lines.

== See also ==
- Andrei Suslin
