= Azriel Lévy =

Israeli mathematician and logician

- עזריאל לוי
- Born: c. 1934
- Education: Hebrew University of Jerusalem
- Known for: Lévy hierarchy, Lévy collapse, Feferman–Levy model
- Scientific career
- Fields: Mathematics, Logic
- Workplaces: Hebrew University of Jerusalem
- Doctoral advisor: Abraham Fraenkel; Abraham Robinson
- Doctoral students: Menachem Magidor; Moti Gitik; Dov Gabbay; Shlomo Vinner

Azriel Lévy (Hebrew: עזריאל לוי; born c. 1934) is an Israeli mathematician, logician, and a professor emeritus at the Hebrew University of Jerusalem.

== Biography ==
Lévy obtained his Ph.D. at the Hebrew University of Jerusalem in 1958, under the supervision of Abraham Fraenkel and Abraham Robinson. Later, using Cohen's method of forcing, he proved several results on the consistency of various statements contradicting the axiom of choice. For example, with J. D. Halpern he proved that the Boolean prime ideal theorem does not imply the axiom of choice. He discovered the models L[x] used in inner model theory. He also introduced the notions of Lévy hierarchy of the formulas of set theory, Levy collapse and the Feferman–Levy model.

His students include Dov Gabbay, Moti Gitik, and Menachem Magidor.

== Selected works ==
- Lévy, Azriel (1958). "The independence of various definitions of finiteness" (PDF). Fundamenta Mathematicae. 46: 1–13. doi:10.4064/fm-46-1-1-13.
- A. Lévy: A hierarchy of formulas in set theory, Memoirs of the American Mathematical Society, 57, 1965.
- J. D. Halpern, A. Lévy: The Boolean prime ideal theorem does not imply the axiom of choice, Axiomatic Set Theory, Symposia Pure Math., 1971, 83–134.
- A. Lévy: Basic Set Theory, Springer-Verlag, Berlin, 1979, 391 pages; reprinted by Dover Publications, 2003.
