= James Earl Baumgartner =

American logician (1943–2011)

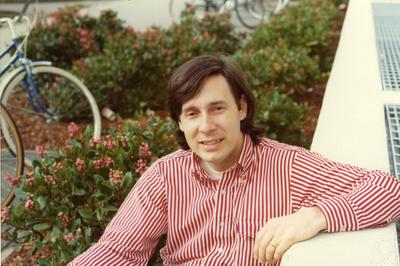
- James Baumgartner in 1975
- Born: March 23, 1943; Wichita, Kansas
- Died: December 28, 2011 (aged 68); Hanover, New Hampshire
- Education: University of California, Berkeley
- Scientific career
- Fields: Mathematics
- Workplaces: Dartmouth College
- Doctoral advisor: Robert Lawson Vaught
- Doctoral students: Jean Larson; Alan D. Taylor; Stanley Wagon

James Earl Baumgartner (March 23, 1943 – December 28, 2011) was an American mathematician who worked in set theory, mathematical logic and foundations, and topology.

Baumgartner was born in Wichita, Kansas, began his undergraduate study at the California Institute of Technology in 1960, then transferred to the University of California, Berkeley, from which he received his PhD in 1970 in mathematics for a dissertation titled Results and Independence Proofs in Combinatorial Set Theory. His advisor was Robert Vaught. He became a professor at Dartmouth College in 1969, and spent his entire career there.

One of Baumgartner's results is the consistency of the statement that any two $\aleph_1$-dense sets of reals are order isomorphic (a set of reals is $\aleph_1$-dense if it has exactly $\aleph_1$ points in every open interval). With András Hajnal he proved the Baumgartner–Hajnal theorem, which states that the partition relation $\omega_1\to(\alpha)^2_n$ holds for $\alpha<\omega_1$ and $n<\omega$. He died in 2011 of a heart attack at his home in Hanover, New Hampshire.

The mathematical context in which Baumgartner worked spans Suslin's problem, Ramsey theory, uncountable order types, disjoint refinements, almost disjoint families, cardinal arithmetics, filters, ideals, and partition relations, iterated forcing and Axiom A, proper forcing and the proper forcing axiom, chromatic number of graphs, a thin very-tall superatomic Boolean algebra, closed unbounded sets, and partition relations.

== See also ==
- Baumgartner's axiom

== Selected publications ==
- Baumgartner, James E., A new class of order types, Annals of Mathematical Logic, 9:187–222, 1976
- Baumgartner, James E., Ineffability properties of cardinals I, Infinite and Finite Sets, Keszthely (Hungary) 1973, volume 10 of Colloquia Mathematica Societatis János Bolyai, pages 109–130. North-Holland, 1975
- Baumgartner, James E.; Harrington, Leo; Kleinberg, Eugene, Adding a closed unbounded set, Journal of Symbolic Logic, 41(2):481–482, 1976
- Baumgartner, James E., Ineffability properties of cardinals II, Robert E. Butts and Jaakko Hintikka, editors, Logic, Foundations of Mathematics and Computability Theory, pages 87–106. Reidel, 1977
- Baumgartner, James E.; Galvin, Fred, Generalized Erdős cardinals and 0^{#}, Annals of Mathematical Logic 15, 289–313, 1978
- Baumgartner, James E.; Erdős, Paul; Galvin, Fred; Larson, J., Colorful partitions of cardinal numbers, Can. J. Math. 31, 524–541, 1979
- Baumgartner, James E.; Erdős, Paul; Higgs, D., Cross-cuts in the power set of an infinite set, Order 1, 139–145, 1984
- Baumgartner, James E. (Editor), Axiomatic Set Theory (Contemporary Mathematics, Volume 31), 1990
