= Standard model (set theory) =

Substructure of a set theoretical universe

In set theory, a standard model for a theory T (in the language of set theory) is a model M for T where the membership relation ∈_{M} is the same as the membership relation ∈ of a set theoretical universe V (restricted to the domain of M). In other words, M is a substructure of V. A standard model M that satisfies the additional transitivity condition that x ∈ y ∈ M implies x ∈ M is a standard transitive model (or simply a transitive model).

Often, when one talks about a model M of set theory, it is assumed that M is a set model, i.e. the domain of M is a set in V. If the domain of M is a proper class, then M is a class model. An inner model is necessarily a class model, because inner models are required to contain all the ordinals of V.

== Examples ==
It is difficult to exhibit an explicit set model of ZFC, because the very existence of a set model implies the consistency of ZFC, which is unprovable within ZFC. However, the universe V itself, when equipped with the ordinary set membership relation ∈, is an intuitive example of a class model that is standard transitive.

To better illustrate the concepts of "standard" and "transitive", we compare the model (V, ∈) with other models isomorphic to it. An arbitrary isomorphism such as f(x) = {x, ∅} will usually yield a non-standard class model, since x ∈ y does not imply {x, ∅} ∈ {y, ∅} in general. To construct a class model that is standard but not transitive, consider a function f defined by ∈-recursion as f(y) = {f(x) | x ∈ y} ∪ {∅} (essentially, we add ∅ to every set and to its elements recursively). Denote the image of f as M. Since ∅ itself is not in M, we have x ∈ y iff f(x) ∈ f(y), and thus (M, ∈) is indeed a standard model, but it is not transitive because ∅ ∈ f(∅) ∈ M but ∅ is not in M. Essentially, non-standard models have a membership relation different from the universe, and standard non-transitive models have elements with "superfluous" members.

== Absoluteness ==
A standard transitive model M will in many aspects behave "exactly like V". For example, the element that satisfies the axiom of empty set in M will be ∅, the empty set of V. Similarly, all sets that can be built up from the empty set, the axiom of pairing and the axiom of union (i.e., all hereditarily finite sets) are all the same as their counterparts in V. In other words, sentences such as "x is the empty set" or "x = {∅, {∅}, {∅, {∅}} (the von Neumann ordinal 3)" have the truth value for the same x, whether they are interpreted in V or any standard transitive model M. Such sentences are known as absolute for standard transitive models.

An example of a sentence that is not absolute for standard transitive models is "y is the power set of x", which by definition means "for all z, z ∈ y if and only if z ⊆ x", or more formally:

∀z (z ∈ y ↔ ∀ w ∈ z (w ∈ x)).

The qualifier ∀w ∈ z means the same thing whether interpreted in V or M: As long as z ∈ M, transitivity ensures that all elements of z must also be in M. Therefore, the right hand side of the biconditional does mean "z is a subset of x". However, the qualifier ∀z means ∀z ∈ V when interpreted in V, but ∀z ∈ M when interpreted in M. In the latter case, only subsets of x that is in M is required to be in y (in fact, only those subsets could be in y due to transitivity). Since an arbitrary subset of x is not necessarily in M (the axiom of separation only works for definable sets), the y that satisfies this sentence in M may be a proper subset of the power set of x in V (i.e., the y that satisfies this sentence in V).

In general, a sentence is absolute as long as it is equivalent to a formula with only bounded quantifiers like ∀w ∈ z. For example, assuming the axiom of regularity:

- "x is an ordinal number" is equivalent to "x is a transitive set strictly totally ordered by set membership" and thus is absolute.
- "x = ω (the first infinite ordinal)" is equivalent to "x is an inductive set containing only 0 and S(y) for y ∈ x" and thus is absolute.

On the other hand:

- "x and y are equinumerous" is not absolute, even though "z is a bijection between x and y" is absolute — the existence of z is exactly the unbounded qualifier that allows the sentence to be not absolute, as it may be the case that z exists in V, but is not in M. In other words, two sets can be equinumerous in V, but not in M.
- "x = ω_{1} (the first uncountable ordinal)" is not absolute, because countability is based on equinumerosity and thus is not absolute. There may exist ordinals that are countable in V but uncountable in M, and the first such ordinal will "play the role of ω_{1}" in M.

In fact, the downward Löwenheim–Skolem theorem together with Mostowski collapse lemma can convert any standard (set) model of ZFC into a standard transitive model M that is itself countable. Every set in M must be countable in V, but at the same time there must exist sets in M that are uncountable in M, such as the sets playing the role of ω_{1} or 𝔓(ω) (the power set of ω). This does not lead to any contradiction because countability is not absolute.
