= Square principle =

In mathematical set theory, a square principle is a combinatorial principle asserting the existence of a cohering sequence of short closed unbounded (club) sets so that no one (long) club set coheres with them all. As such they may be viewed as a kind of incompactness phenomenon. They were introduced by Ronald Jensen in his analysis of the fine structure of the constructible universe L.

== Definition ==
Define Sing to be the class of all limit ordinals which are not regular. Global square states that there is a system $(C_\beta)_{\beta \in \mathrm{Sing}}$ satisfying:

1. $C_\beta$ is a club set of $\beta$.
2. ot$(C_\beta) < \beta$
3. If $\gamma$ is a limit point of $C_\beta$ then $\gamma \in \mathrm{Sing}$ and $C_\gamma = C_\beta \cap \gamma$

== Construction of $\kappa$-Suslin trees ==
In the proof of construction of $\kappa$ or $\kappa^+$-Suslin trees in L, one might want to construct said tree purely via recursion on the levels. On a stationary set of levels, we must have that all antichains must be "killed off", but at a limit stage $\alpha$ later in the construction, we might have $T \restriction \alpha$ "resemble" being Aronszajn. To counteract this, we can use $\Box_\kappa$, which allows us to split up the construction of the tree into two cases. At some stages, we might kill off some antichains using $\Diamond$, but at later stages (such as $\alpha$ in the example), $\Box_\kappa$ is used to refine the construction.

== Variant relative to a cardinal ==
Jensen introduced also a local version of the principle. If $\kappa$ is an uncountable cardinal, then $\Box_\kappa$ asserts that there is a sequence $(C_\beta\mid\beta \text{ a limit point of }\kappa^+)$ satisfying:

1. $C_\beta$ is a club set of $\beta$.
2. If $cf \beta < \kappa$, then $|C_\beta| < \kappa$
3. If $\gamma$ is a limit point of $C_\beta$ then $C_\gamma = C_\beta \cap \gamma$

Jensen proved that this principle holds in the constructible universe for any uncountable cardinal $\kappa$.

== Notes ==
- Jensen, R. Björn (1972), "The fine structure of the constructible hierarchy", Annals of Mathematical Logic, 4 (3): 229–308, doi:10.1016/0003-4843(72)90001-0, MR 0309729
