= Order isomorphism =

Equivalence of partially ordered sets

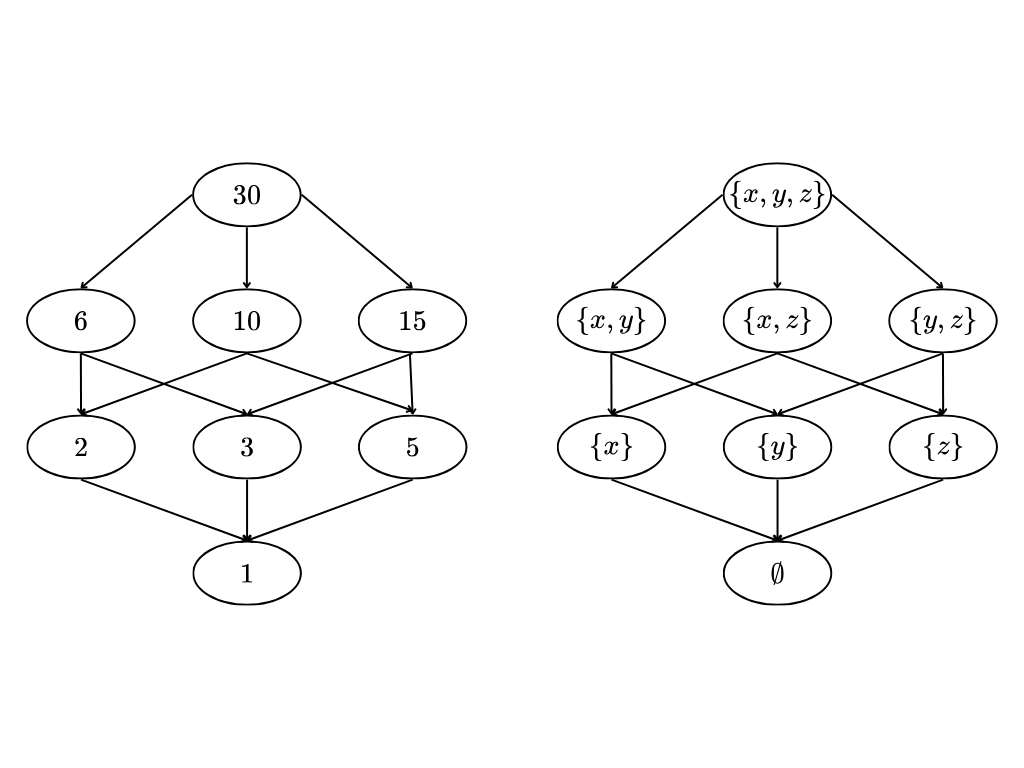
On the left, the set of divisors of the number 30; on the right, the power set of the set $\{x,y,z\}$. The underlying order structure of the two sets is identical, so the sets are order-isomorphic

In the mathematical field of order theory, an order isomorphism is a special kind of monotone function that constitutes a suitable notion of isomorphism for partially ordered sets (posets). Whenever two posets are order isomorphic, they can be considered to be "essentially the same" in the sense that either of the orders can be obtained from the other just by renaming of elements. Two strictly weaker notions that relate to order isomorphisms are order embeddings and Galois connections.

The idea of isomorphism can be understood for finite orders in terms of Hasse diagrams. Two finite orders are isomorphic exactly when a single Hasse diagram (up to relabeling of its elements) expresses them both, in other words when every Hasse diagram of either can be converted to a Hasse diagram of the other by simply relabeling the vertices.

== Definition ==
Formally, given two posets $(S,\le_S)$ and $(T,\le_T)$, an order isomorphism from $(S,\le_S)$ to $(T,\le_T)$ is a bijective function $f$ from $S$ to $T$ with the property that, for every $x$ and $y$ in $S$, $x \le_S y$ if and only if $f(x)\le_T f(y)$. That is, it is a bijective order-embedding.

It is also possible to define an order isomorphism to be a surjective order-embedding. The two assumptions that $f$ cover all the elements of $T$ and that it preserve orderings, are enough to ensure that $f$ is also one-to-one, for if $f(x)=f(y)$ then (by the assumption that $f$ preserves the order) it would follow that $x\le y$ and $y\le x$, implying by the definition of a partial order that $x=y$.

Yet another characterization of order isomorphisms is that they are exactly the monotone bijections that have a monotone inverse.

An order isomorphism from a partially ordered set to itself is called an order automorphism.

When an additional algebraic structure is imposed on the posets $(S,\le_S)$ and $(T,\le_T)$, a function from $(S,\le_S)$ to $(T,\le_T)$ must satisfy additional properties to be regarded as an isomorphism. For example, given two partially ordered groups (po-groups) $(G, \le_G)$ and $(H, \le_H)$, an isomorphism of po-groups from $(G,\leq_G)$ to $(H,\le_H)$ is an order isomorphism that is also a group isomorphism, not merely a bijection that is an order embedding.

== Examples ==
- The identity function on any partially ordered set is always an order automorphism.
- Negation is an order isomorphism from $(\mathbb{R},\leq)$ to $(\mathbb{R},\geq)$ (where $\mathbb{R}$ is the set of real numbers and $\le$ denotes the usual numerical comparison), since −x ≥ −y if and only if x ≤ y.
- The open interval $(0,1)$ (again, ordered numerically) does not have an order isomorphism to or from the closed interval $[0,1]$: the closed interval has a least element, but the open interval does not, and order isomorphisms must preserve the existence of least elements.
- By Cantor's isomorphism theorem, every unbounded countable dense linear order is isomorphic to the ordering of the rational numbers. Explicit order isomorphisms between the quadratic algebraic numbers, the rational numbers, and the dyadic rational numbers are provided by Minkowski's question-mark function.

== Order types ==
If $f$ is an order isomorphism, then so is its inverse function. Also, if $f$ is an order isomorphism from $(S,\le_S)$ to $(T,\le_T)$ and $g$ is an order isomorphism from $(T,\le_T)$ to $(U,\le_U)$, then the function composition of $f$ and $g$ is itself an order isomorphism, from $(S,\le_S)$ to $(U,\le_U)$.

Two partially ordered sets are said to be order isomorphic when there exists an order isomorphism from one to the other. Identity functions, function inverses, and compositions of functions correspond, respectively, to the three defining characteristics of an equivalence relation: reflexivity, symmetry, and transitivity. Therefore, order isomorphism is an equivalence relation. The class of partially ordered sets can be partitioned by it into equivalence classes, families of partially ordered sets that are all isomorphic to each other. These equivalence classes are called order types.

== See also ==
- Permutation pattern, a permutation that is order-isomorphic to a subsequence of another permutation
- Holland's embedding theorem, on groups of order automorphisms of a totally ordered set
