= Collapsing algebra =

In mathematics, a collapsing algebra is a type of Boolean algebra sometimes used in forcing to reduce ("collapse") the size of cardinals. The posets used to generate collapsing algebras were introduced by Azriel Lévy in 1963.

The collapsing algebra of λ^{ω} is a complete Boolean algebra with at least λ elements but generated by a countable number of elements. As the size of countably generated complete Boolean algebras is unbounded, this shows that there is no free complete Boolean algebra on a countable number of elements.

== Definition ==
There are several slightly different sorts of collapsing algebras.

If κ and λ are cardinals, then the Boolean algebra of regular open sets of the product space κ^{λ} is a collapsing algebra. Here κ and λ are both given the discrete topology. There are several different options for the topology of κ^{λ}. The simplest option is to take the usual product topology. Another option is to take the topology generated by open sets consisting of functions whose value is specified on less than λ elements of λ.
