= Additively indecomposable ordinal =

In set theory, a branch of mathematics, an additively indecomposable ordinal α is any ordinal number that is not 0 such that for any $\beta,\gamma<\alpha$, we have $\beta+\gamma<\alpha.$ Additively indecomposable ordinals were named the gamma numbers by Cantor,^{p.20} and are also called additive principal numbers. The class of additively indecomposable ordinals may be denoted $\mathbb H$, from the German "Hauptzahl". The additively indecomposable ordinals are precisely those ordinals of the form $\omega^\beta$ for some ordinal $\beta$.

From the continuity of addition in its right argument, we get that if $\beta < \alpha$ and α is additively indecomposable, then $\beta + \alpha = \alpha.$

Obviously 1 is additively indecomposable, since $0+0<1.$ No finite ordinal other than $1$ is additively indecomposable. Also, $\omega$ is additively indecomposable, since the sum of two finite ordinals is still finite. More generally, every infinite initial ordinal (an ordinal corresponding to a cardinal number) is additively indecomposable.

The class of additively indecomposable numbers is closed and unbounded. Its enumerating function is normal, given by $\omega^\alpha$.

The derivative of $\omega^\alpha$ (which enumerates its fixed points) is written $\varepsilon_\alpha$ Ordinals of this form (that is, fixed points of $\omega^\alpha$) are called epsilon numbers. The number $\varepsilon_0 = \omega^{\omega^{\omega^{\cdots}}}$ is therefore the first fixed point of the sequence $\omega,\omega^\omega\!,\omega^{\omega^\omega}\!\!,\ldots$

== Multiplicatively indecomposable ==
A similar notion can be defined for multiplication. If α is greater than the multiplicative identity, 1, and β < α and γ < α imply β·γ < α, then α is multiplicatively indecomposable. The finite ordinal 2 is multiplicatively indecomposable since 1·1 = 1 < 2. Besides 2, the multiplicatively indecomposable ordinals (named the delta numbers by Cantor^{p.20}) are those of the form $\omega^{\omega^\alpha} \,$ for any ordinal α. Every epsilon number is multiplicatively indecomposable; and every multiplicatively indecomposable ordinal (other than 2) is additively indecomposable. The delta numbers (other than 2) are the same as the prime ordinals that are limits.

== Higher indecomposables ==
Exponentially indecomposable ordinals are equal to the epsilon numbers. Tetration, as usually defined, gets stuck at limit ordinals, so the notion of indecomposable beyond exponentiation is not useful.

== See also ==
- Ordinal arithmetic
