= Bjarni Jónsson =

Icelandic mathematician (1920–2016)

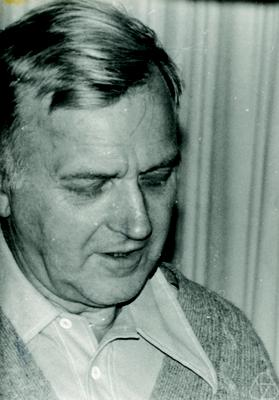
- Born: February 15, 1920; Dragháls, Iceland
- Died: September 30, 2016 (aged 96); Cincinnati, Ohio, U.S.
- Education: University of California, Berkeley
- Known for: Jónsson's lemma, Jónsson algebras, ω-Jónsson functions, Jónsson cardinals, Jónsson terms, Jónsson–Tarski algebras, Jónsson–Tarski duality
- Scientific career
- Fields: Mathematics, logic
- Workplaces: Brown University; Vanderbilt University; University of Minnesota, Minneapolis
- Doctoral advisor: Alfred Tarski
- Doctoral students: Peter Fillmore; Frederick Galvin

Bjarni Jónsson (February 15, 1920 – September 30, 2016) was an Icelandic mathematician and logician working in universal algebra, lattice theory, model theory and set theory. He was emeritus distinguished professor of mathematics at Vanderbilt University and the honorary editor in chief of Algebra Universalis. He received his PhD in 1946 at UC Berkeley under supervision of Alfred Tarski.

In 1974 he was an invited speaker at the International Congress of Mathematicians in Vancouver where he spoke on Congruence varieties.

In 2012, he became a fellow of the American Mathematical Society.

== Work ==
Jónsson's lemma as well as several mathematical objects are named after him, among them Jónsson algebras, ω-Jónsson functions, Jónsson cardinals, Jónsson terms, Jónsson–Tarski algebras and Jónsson–Tarski duality.

== Publications ==
- 1972: —, Topics in Universal Algebra, Lecture Notes in Mathematics, vol. 250, Berlin, New York: Springer-Verlag, doi:10.1007/BFb0058648, ISBN 978-3-540-05722-2, MR 0345895
- 1979: "Congruence varieties", pages 348 to 377 of Universal Algebra, second edition, by George Grätzer (appendix 3)
