= Mostowski collapse lemma =

Result in mathematics and set theory

In mathematical logic, the Mostowski collapse lemma, also known as the Shepherdson–Mostowski collapse, is a theorem of set theory introduced by Andrzej Mostowski (1949, theorem 3) and John Shepherdson (1953).

== Statement ==
Suppose that R is a binary relation on a class X such that

- R is set-like: R^{−1}[x] = {y : y R x} is a set for every x,
- R is well-founded: every nonempty subset S of X contains an R-minimal element (i.e. an element x ∈ S such that R^{−1}[x] ∩ S is empty),
- R is extensional: R^{−1}[x] ≠ R^{−1}[y] for every distinct elements x and y of X

The Mostowski collapse lemma states that for every such R there exists a unique transitive class (possibly proper) whose structure under the membership relation is isomorphic to (X, R), and the isomorphism is unique. The isomorphism maps each element x of X to the set of images of elements y of X such that y R x (Jech 2003:69).

== Generalizations ==
Every well-founded set-like relation can be embedded into a well-founded set-like extensional relation. This implies the following variant of the Mostowski collapse lemma: every well-founded set-like relation is isomorphic to set-membership on a (non-unique, and not necessarily transitive) class.

A mapping F such that F(x) = {F(y) : y R x} for all x in X can be defined for any well-founded set-like relation R on X by well-founded recursion. It provides a homomorphism of R onto a (non-unique, in general) transitive class. The homomorphism F is an isomorphism if and only if R is extensional.

The well-foundedness assumption of the Mostowski lemma can be alleviated or dropped in non-well-founded set theories. In Boffa's set theory, every set-like extensional relation is isomorphic to set-membership on a (non-unique) transitive class. In set theory with Aczel's anti-foundation axiom, every set-like relation is bisimilar to set-membership on a unique transitive class, hence every bisimulation-minimal set-like relation is isomorphic to a unique transitive class.

== Application ==
Every set model of ZF is set-like and extensional. If the model is well-founded, then by the Mostowski collapse lemma it is isomorphic to a transitive model of ZF and such a transitive model is unique.

Saying that the membership relation of some model of ZF is well-founded is stronger than saying that the axiom of regularity is true in the model. There exists a model M = (X, R) (assuming the consistency of ZF) whose domain X has a subset A with no R-minimal element, but this set A is not a "set in the model". More precisely, there is no x in X such that A = R^{−1}[x]. So M satisfies the axiom of regularity (it is "internally" well-founded), but M is not well-founded and the Mostowski collapse lemma does not apply to it.
