= Absoluteness (logic) =

Mathematical logic concept

In mathematical logic, a formula is said to be absolute to some class of structures (also called models), if it has the same truth value in each of the members of that class. One can also speak of absoluteness of a formula between two structures, if it has the same truth value in both of them. Theorems about absoluteness typically establish relationships between the absoluteness of formulas and their syntactic form.

There are two weaker forms of partial absoluteness. If the truth of a formula in each substructure N of a structure M follows from its truth in M, the formula is downward absolute. If the truth of a formula in a structure N implies its truth in each structure M extending N, the formula is upward absolute.

Issues of absoluteness are particularly important in set theory and model theory, fields where multiple structures are considered simultaneously. In model theory, several basic results and definitions are motivated by absoluteness. In set theory, the issue of which properties of sets are absolute is well studied. The Shoenfield absoluteness theorem, due to Joseph Shoenfield (1961), establishes the absoluteness of a large class of formulas between a model of set theory and its constructible universe, with important methodological consequences. The absoluteness of large cardinal axioms is also studied, with positive and negative results known.

== In model theory ==
In model theory, there are several general results and definitions related to absoluteness. A fundamental example of downward absoluteness is that universal sentences (those with only universal quantifiers) that are true in a structure are also true in every substructure of the original structure. Conversely, existential sentences are upward absolute from a structure to any structure containing it.

Two structures are defined to be elementarily equivalent if they agree about the truth value of all sentences in their shared language, that is, if all sentences in their language are absolute between the two structures. A theory is defined to be model complete if whenever M and N are models of the theory and M is a substructure of N, then M is an elementary substructure of N.

== In set theory ==
A major part of modern set theory involves the study of different models of ZF and ZFC. It is crucial for the study of such models to know which properties of a set are absolute to different models. It is common to begin with a fixed model of set theory and only consider other transitive models containing the same ordinals as the fixed model.

Certain properties are absolute to all transitive models of set theory, including the following (see Jech (2003 sec. I.12) and Kunen (1980 sec. IV.3)).

- x is the empty set.
- x is an ordinal.
- x is a finite ordinal.
- x is a successor ordinal.
- x is a limit ordinal.
- x = ω.
- x is finite.
- x is (the graph of) a function.

Other properties are not absolute:

- being countable
- being a cardinal
- being a regular cardinal
- being a limit cardinal
- being an inaccessible cardinal

=== Failure of absoluteness for countability ===
Skolem's paradox is the seeming contradiction that on the one hand, the set of real numbers is uncountable (and this is provable from ZFC, or even from a small finite subsystem ZFC' of ZFC), while on the other hand there are countable transitive models of ZFC' (this is provable in ZFC), and the set of real numbers in such a model will be a countable set. The paradox can be resolved by noting that countability is not absolute to submodels of a particular model of ZFC. It is possible that a set X is countable in a model of set theory but uncountable in a submodel containing X, because the submodel may contain no bijection between X and ω, while the definition of countability is the existence of such a bijection. The Löwenheim–Skolem theorem, when applied to ZFC, shows that this situation does occur.

=== Shoenfield's absoluteness theorem ===
Shoenfield's absoluteness theorem shows that $\Pi^1_2$ and $\Sigma^1_2$ sentences in the analytical hierarchy are absolute between a model V of ZF and the constructible universe L of the model, when interpreted as statements about the natural numbers in each model. The theorem can be relativized to allow the sentence to use sets of natural numbers from V as parameters, in which case L must be replaced by the smallest submodel containing those parameters and all the ordinals. The theorem has corollaries that $\Sigma^1_3$ sentences are upward absolute (if such a sentence holds in L then it holds in V) and $\Pi^1_3$ sentences are downward absolute (if they hold in V then they hold in L). Because any two transitive models of set theory with the same ordinals have the same constructible universe, Shoenfield's theorem shows that two such models must agree about the truth of all $\Pi^1_2$ sentences.

One consequence of Shoenfield's theorem relates to the axiom of choice. Gödel proved that the constructible universe L always satisfies ZFC, including the axiom of choice, even when V is only assumed to satisfy ZF. Shoenfield's theorem shows that if there is a model of ZF in which a given $\Sigma^1_3$ statement φ is false, then φ is also false in the constructible universe of that model. In contrapositive, this means that if ZFC proves a $\Sigma^1_3$ sentence then that sentence is also provable in ZF. The same argument can be applied to any other principle that always holds in the constructible universe, such as the combinatorial principle ◊. Even if these principles are independent of ZF, each of their $\Sigma^1_3$ consequences is already provable in ZF. In particular, this includes any of their consequences that can be expressed in the (first-order) language of Peano arithmetic.

Shoenfield's theorem also shows that there are limits to the independence results that can be obtained by forcing. In particular, any sentence of Peano arithmetic is absolute to transitive models of set theory with the same ordinals. Thus it is not possible to use forcing to change the truth value of arithmetical sentences, as forcing does not change the ordinals of the model to which it is applied. More generally, many famous open problems, such as the Riemann hypothesis and the P = NP problem, can be expressed as $\Pi^1_2$ sentences (or sentences of lower complexity), and thus cannot be proven independent of ZFC by forcing.

=== Large cardinals ===
There are certain large cardinals that cannot exist in the constructible universe (L) of any model of set theory. Nevertheless, the constructible universe contains all the ordinal numbers that the original model of set theory contains. This "paradox" can be resolved by noting that the defining properties of some large cardinals are not absolute to submodels.

One example of such a nonabsolute large cardinal axiom is for measurable cardinals; for an ordinal to be a measurable cardinal there must exist another set (the measure) satisfying certain properties. It can be shown that no such measure is constructible.

== See also ==
- Conservative extension
- Lévy hierarchy
