= Set Theory: An Introduction to Independence Proofs =

Mathematics textbook

- First edition
- Author: Kenneth Kunen
- Language: English
- Series: Studies in Logic and the Foundations of Mathematics
- Subject: Set Theory
- Genre: Textbook
- Publisher: North Holland
- Publication date: 1986
- Pages: 313

Set Theory: An Introduction to Independence Proofs is a textbook and reference work in set theory by Kenneth Kunen. It starts from basic notions, including the ZFC axioms, and quickly develops combinatorial notions such as trees, Suslin's problem, the diamond principle, and Martin's axiom. It develops some basic model theory (rather specifically aimed at models of set theory) and the theory of Gödel's constructible universe, L. The book then proceeds to describe the method of forcing.

Kunen completely rewrote the book for the 2011 edition (under the title Set Theory), including more model theory.
