= Set-theoretic topology =

Intersection of Set Theory and General Topology

The space of integers has cardinality $\aleph_0$, while the real numbers has cardinality $2^{\aleph_0}$. The topologies of both spaces have cardinality $2^{\aleph_0}$. These are examples of cardinal functions, a topic in set-theoretic topology.

In mathematics, set-theoretic topology is a subject that combines set theory and general topology. It focuses on topological questions that can be solved using set-theoretic methods, for example, Suslin's problem.

== Objects studied in set-theoretic topology ==
=== Dowker spaces ===
In the mathematical field of general topology, a Dowker space is a topological space that is T_{4} but not countably paracompact.

Dowker conjectured that there were no Dowker spaces, and the conjecture was not resolved until M.E. Rudin constructed one in 1971. Rudin's counterexample is a very large space (of cardinality $\aleph_\omega^{\aleph_0}$) and is generally not well-behaved. Zoltán Balogh gave the first ZFC construction of a small (cardinality continuum) example, which was more well-behaved than Rudin's. Using PCF theory, M. Kojman and S. Shelah constructed a subspace of Rudin's Dowker space of cardinality $\aleph_{\omega+1}$ that is also Dowker.

=== Normal Moore spaces ===
A famous problem is the normal Moore space question, a question in general topology that was the subject of intense research. The answer to the normal Moore space question was eventually proved to be independent of ZFC.

=== Cardinal functions ===
Cardinal functions are widely used in topology as a tool for describing various topological properties. Below are some examples. (Note: some authors, arguing that "there are no finite cardinal numbers in general topology", prefer to define the cardinal functions listed below so that they never take on finite cardinal numbers as values; this requires modifying some of the definitions given below, e.g. by adding "$\;\; + \;\aleph_0$" to the right-hand side of the definitions, etc.)

- Perhaps the simplest cardinal invariants of a topological space X are its cardinality and the cardinality of its topology, denoted respectively by |X| and o(X).
- The weight w(X ) of a topological space X is the smallest possible cardinality of a base for X. When w(X ) $\le \aleph_0$ the space X is said to be second countable.
  - The $\pi$-weight of a space X is the smallest cardinality of a $\pi$-base for X. (A $\pi$-base is a set of nonempty opens whose supersets includes all opens.)
- The character of a topological space X at a point x is the smallest cardinality of a local base for x. The character of space X is
  $\chi(X)=\sup \; \{\chi(x,X) : x\in X\}.$
  When $\chi(X) \le \aleph_0$ the space X is said to be first countable.
- The density d(X ) of a space X is the smallest cardinality of a dense subset of X. When $\rm{d}(X) \le \aleph_0$ the space X is said to be separable.
- The Lindelöf number L(X ) of a space X is the smallest infinite cardinality such that every open cover has a subcover of cardinality no more than L(X ). When $\rm{L}(X) = \aleph_0$ the space X is said to be a Lindelöf space.
- The cellularity of a space X is
  ${\rm c}(X)=\sup\{|{\mathcal U}|:{\mathcal U}$ is a family of mutually disjoint non-empty open subsets of $X \}$.
  - The Hereditary cellularity (sometimes spread) is the least upper bound of cellularities of its subsets:
    $s(X)={\rm hc}(X)=\sup\{ {\rm c} (Y) : Y\subseteq X \}$
    or
    $s(X)=\sup\{|Y|:Y\subseteq X$ with the subspace topology is discrete $\}$.
- The tightness t(x, X) of a topological space X at a point $x\in X$ is the smallest cardinal number $\alpha$ such that, whenever $x\in{\rm cl}_X(Y)$ for some subset Y of X, there exists a subset Z of Y, with |Z | ≤ $\alpha$, such that $x\in{\rm cl}_X(Z)$. Symbolically,
  $t(x,X)=\sup\big\{\min\{|Z|:Z\subseteq Y\ \wedge\ x\in {\rm cl}_X(Z)\}:Y\subseteq X\ \wedge\ x\in {\rm cl}_X(Y)\big\}.$
  The tightness of a space X is $t(X)=\sup\{t(x,X):x\in X\}$. When t(X) = $\aleph_0$ the space X is said to be countably generated or countably tight.
  - The augmented tightness of a space X, $t^+(X)$ is the smallest regular cardinal $\alpha$ such that for any $Y\subseteq X$, $x\in{\rm cl}_X(Y)$ there is a subset Z of Y with cardinality less than $\alpha$, such that $x\in{\rm cl}_X(Z)$.

=== Martin's axiom ===
For any cardinal k, we define a statement, denoted by MA(k):

For any partial order P satisfying the countable chain condition (hereafter ccc) and any family D of dense sets in P such that |D| ≤ k, there is a filter F on P such that F ∩ d is non-empty for every d in D.

Since it is a theorem of ZFC that MA(c) fails, Martin's axiom is stated as:

Martin's axiom (MA): For every k < c, MA(k) holds.

In this case (for application of ccc), an antichain is a subset A of P such that any two distinct members of A are incompatible (two elements are said to be compatible if there exists a common element below both of them in the partial order). This differs from, for example, the notion of antichain in the context of trees.

MA($2^{\aleph_0}$) is false: [0, 1] is a compact Hausdorff space, which is separable and so ccc. It has no isolated points, so points in it are nowhere dense, but it is the union of $2^{\aleph_0}$ many points.

An equivalent formulation is: If X is a compact Hausdorff topological space which satisfies the ccc then X is not the union of k or fewer nowhere dense subsets.

Martin's axiom has a number of other interesting combinatorial, analytic and topological consequences:

- The union of k or fewer null sets in an atomless σ-finite Borel measure on a Polish space is null. In particular, the union of k or fewer subsets of R of Lebesgue measure 0 also has Lebesgue measure 0.
- A compact Hausdorff space X with |X| < 2^{k} is sequentially compact, i.e., every sequence has a convergent subsequence.
- No non-principal ultrafilter on N has a base of cardinality < k.
- Equivalently for any x in βN\N we have χ(x) ≥ k, where χ is the character of x, and so χ(βN) ≥ k.
- MA($\aleph_1$) implies that a product of ccc topological spaces is ccc (this in turn implies there are no Suslin lines).
- MA + ¬CH implies that there exists a Whitehead group that is not free; Shelah used this to show that the Whitehead problem is independent of ZFC.

=== Forcing ===
Forcing is a technique invented by Paul Cohen for proving consistency and independence results. It was first used, in 1963, to prove the independence of the axiom of choice and the continuum hypothesis from Zermelo–Fraenkel set theory. Forcing was considerably reworked and simplified in the 1960s, and has proven to be an extremely powerful technique both within set theory and in areas of mathematical logic such as recursion theory.

Intuitively, forcing consists of expanding the set theoretical universe V to a larger universe V*. In this bigger universe, for example, one might have many new subsets of ω = {0,1,2,…} that were not there in the old universe, and thereby violate the continuum hypothesis. While impossible on the face of it, this is just another version of Cantor's paradox about infinity. In principle, one could consider
$$V^* = V \times \{0,1\}, \,$$
identify $x \in V$ with $(x,0)$, and then introduce an expanded membership relation involving the "new" sets of the form $(x,1)$. Forcing is a more elaborate version of this idea, reducing the expansion to the existence of one new set, and allowing for fine control over the properties of the expanded universe.

See the main articles for applications such as random reals.
