= List of statements independent of ZFC =

The mathematical statements discussed below are provably independent of ZFC (the canonical axiomatic set theory of contemporary mathematics, consisting of the Zermelo–Fraenkel axioms plus the axiom of choice), assuming that ZFC is consistent. A statement is independent of ZFC (sometimes phrased "undecidable in ZFC") if it can neither be proven nor disproven from the axioms of ZFC.

== Axiomatic set theory ==
In 1931, Kurt Gödel proved his incompleteness theorems, establishing that many mathematical theories, including ZFC, cannot prove their own consistency. Assuming ω-consistency of such a theory, the consistency statement can also not be disproven, meaning it is independent. A few years later, other arithmetic statements were defined that are independent of any such theory, see for example Rosser's trick.

The following set theoretic statements are independent of ZFC, among others:

- the continuum hypothesis or CH (Gödel produced a model of ZFC in which CH is true, showing that CH cannot be disproven in ZFC; Paul Cohen later invented the method of forcing to exhibit a model of ZFC in which CH fails, showing that CH cannot be proven in ZFC. The following four independence results are also due to Gödel/Cohen.);
- the generalized continuum hypothesis (GCH);
- a related independent statement is that if a set x has fewer elements than y, then x also has fewer subsets than y. In particular, this statement fails when the cardinalities of the power sets of x and y coincide;
- the axiom of constructibility (V = L);
- the diamond principle (◊);
- Martin's axiom (MA);
- MA + ¬CH (independence shown by Solovay and Tennenbaum).
- Every Aronszajn tree is special (EATS);

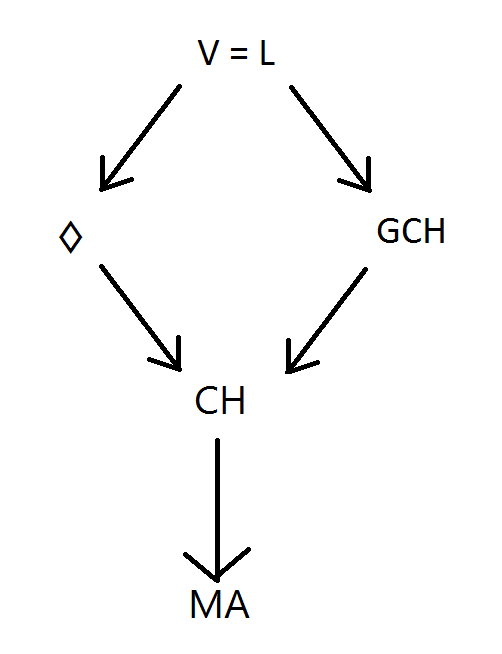
Diagram showing the implication chains

We have the following chains of implications:

V = L → ◊ → CH,
V = L → GCH → CH,
CH → MA,

and (see section on order theory):

◊ → ¬SH,
MA + ¬CH → EATS → SH.

Several statements related to the existence of large cardinals cannot be proven in ZFC (assuming ZFC is consistent). These are independent of ZFC provided that they are consistent with ZFC, which most working set theorists believe to be the case. These statements are strong enough to imply the consistency of ZFC. This has the consequence (via Gödel's second incompleteness theorem) that their consistency with ZFC cannot be proven in ZFC (assuming ZFC is consistent). The following statements belong to this class:

- Existence of inaccessible cardinals
- Existence of Mahlo cardinals
- Existence of measurable cardinals (first conjectured by Ulam)
- Existence of supercompact cardinals

The following statements can be proven to be independent of ZFC assuming the consistency of a suitable large cardinal:

- Proper forcing axiom
- Open coloring axiom
- Martin's maximum
- Existence of 0^{#}
- Singular cardinals hypothesis
- Projective determinacy (and even the full axiom of determinacy if the axiom of choice is not assumed)

== Set theory of the real line ==
There are many cardinal invariants of the real line, connected with measure theory and statements related to the Baire category theorem, whose exact values are independent of ZFC. While nontrivial relations can be proved between them, most cardinal invariants can be any regular cardinal between ℵ_{1} and 2^{ℵ_{0}}. This is a major area of study in the set theory of the real line (see Cichon diagram). MA has a tendency to set most interesting cardinal invariants equal to 2^{ℵ_{0}}.

A subset X of the real line is a strong measure zero set if to every sequence (ε_{n}) of positive reals there exists a sequence of intervals (I_{n}) which covers X and such that I_{n} has length at most ε_{n}. Borel's conjecture, that every strong measure zero set is countable, is independent of ZFC.

A subset X of the real line is $\aleph_1$-dense if every open interval contains $\aleph_1$-many elements of X. Whether all $\aleph_1$-dense sets are order-isomorphic is independent of ZFC.

== Order theory ==
Suslin's problem asks whether a specific short list of properties characterizes the ordered set of real numbers R. This is undecidable in ZFC. A Suslin line is an ordered set which satisfies this specific list of properties but is not order-isomorphic to R. The diamond principle ◊ proves the existence of a Suslin line, while MA + ¬CH implies EATS (every Aronszajn tree is special), which in turn implies (but is not equivalent to) the nonexistence of Suslin lines. Ronald Jensen proved that CH does not imply the existence of a Suslin line.

Existence of Kurepa trees is independent of ZFC, assuming consistency of an inaccessible cardinal.

Existence of a partition of the ordinal number $\omega_2$ into two colors with no monochromatic uncountable sequentially closed subset is independent of ZFC, ZFC + CH, and ZFC + ¬CH, assuming consistency of a Mahlo cardinal. This theorem of Shelah answers a question of H. Friedman.

== Abstract algebra ==
In 1973, Saharon Shelah showed that the Whitehead problem ("is every abelian group A with Ext^{1}(A, Z) = 0 a free abelian group?") is independent of ZFC. An abelian group with Ext^{1}(A, Z) = 0 is called a Whitehead group; MA + ¬CH proves the existence of a non-free Whitehead group, while V = L proves that all Whitehead groups are free. In one of the earliest applications of proper forcing, Shelah constructed a model of ZFC + CH in which there is a non-free Whitehead group.

A few years earlier, Barbara Osofsky had proved several independence results, including:

- Consider the ring A = R[x,y,z] of polynomials in three variables over the real numbers and its field of fractions M = R(x,y,z). The projective dimension of M as A-module is 2 if the continuum hypothesis holds and 3 if it doesn't hold.
- If the continuum hypothesis holds, then every ring that's a direct product of countably many fields has global dimension 2; if the continuum hypothesis does not hold, then each such ring has global dimension greater than 2.

== Number theory ==
One can write down a concrete polynomial p ∈ Z[x_{1}, ..., x_{9}] such that the statement "there are integers m_{1}, ..., m_{9} with p(m_{1}, ..., m_{9}) = 0" can neither be proven nor disproven in ZFC (assuming ZFC is consistent). This follows from Yuri Matiyasevich's resolution of Hilbert's tenth problem; the polynomial is constructed so that it has an integer root if and only if ZFC is inconsistent.

== Measure theory ==
A stronger version of Fubini's theorem for positive functions, where the function is no longer assumed to be measurable but merely that the two iterated integrals are well defined and exist, is independent of ZFC. On the one hand, CH implies that there exists a function on the unit square whose iterated integrals are not equal — the function is simply the indicator function of an ordering of [0, 1] equivalent to a well ordering of the cardinal ω_{1}. A similar example can be constructed using MA. On the other hand, the consistency of the strong Fubini theorem was first shown by Friedman. It can also be deduced from a variant of Freiling's axiom of symmetry.

== Topology ==
The Normal Moore Space conjecture, namely that every normal Moore space is metrizable, can be disproven assuming the continuum hypothesis or assuming both Martin's axiom and the negation of the continuum hypothesis, and can be proven assuming a certain axiom which implies the existence of large cardinals. Thus, granted large cardinals, the Normal Moore Space conjecture is independent of ZFC.

The existence of an S-space is independent of ZFC. In particular, it is implied by the existence of a Suslin line.

== Functional analysis ==
Garth Dales and Robert M. Solovay proved in 1976 that Kaplansky's conjecture, namely that every algebra homomorphism from the Banach algebra C(X) (where X is some compact Hausdorff space) into any other Banach algebra must be continuous, is independent of ZFC. CH implies that for any infinite X there exists a discontinuous homomorphism into any Banach algebra.

Consider the algebra B(H) of bounded linear operators on the infinite-dimensional separable Hilbert space H. The compact operators form a two-sided ideal in B(H). The question of whether this ideal is the sum of two properly smaller ideals is independent of ZFC, as was proved by Andreas Blass and Saharon Shelah in 1987.

Charles Akemann and Nik Weaver showed in 2003 that the statement "there exists a counterexample to Naimark's problem which is generated by ℵ_{1}, elements" is independent of ZFC.

Miroslav Bačák and Petr Hájek proved in 2008 that the statement "every Asplund space of density character ω_{1} has a renorming with the Mazur intersection property" is independent of ZFC. The result is shown using Martin's maximum axiom, while Mar Jiménez and José Pedro Moreno (1997) had presented a counterexample assuming CH.

As shown by Ilijas Farah and N. Christopher Phillips and Nik Weaver, the existence of outer automorphisms of the Calkin algebra depends on set theoretic assumptions beyond ZFC.

Wetzel's problem, which asks if every set of analytic functions which takes at most countably many distinct values at every point is necessarily countable, is true if and only if the continuum hypothesis is false.

== Model theory ==
Chang's conjecture is independent of ZFC assuming the consistency of an Erdős cardinal.

== Computability theory ==
Marcia Groszek and Theodore Slaman gave examples of statements independent of ZFC concerning the structure of the Turing degrees. In particular, whether there exists a maximally independent set of degrees of size less than continuum.

Numerical values of the busy beaver function are known to be independent of ZFC, such as BB(748). This is done by constructing a Turing machine with 748 states which halts if and only if there is an inconsistency in ZFC. If ZFC is consistent, it cannot prove this machine halts. It therefore also cannot prove any theorem of the form "BB(748) < n" for any concrete natural number n.
