= Suslin tree =

Mathematical tree

In mathematics, a Suslin tree is a tree of height ω_{1} such that every branch and every antichain is countable. They are named after Mikhail Yakovlevich Suslin.

Every Suslin tree is an Aronszajn tree.

The existence of a Suslin tree is independent of ZFC, and is equivalent to the existence of a Suslin line (shown by Kurepa (1935)) or a Suslin algebra. The diamond principle, a consequence of V=L, implies that there is a Suslin tree, and Martin's axiom MA(ℵ_{1}) implies that there are no Suslin trees.

More generally, for any infinite cardinal κ, a κ-Suslin tree is a tree of height κ such that every branch and antichain has cardinality less than κ. In particular a Suslin tree is the same as a ω_{1}-Suslin tree. Jensen (1972) showed that if V=L then there is a κ-Suslin tree for every infinite successor cardinal κ. Whether the Generalized Continuum Hypothesis implies the existence of an ℵ_{2}-Suslin tree, is a longstanding open problem.

== See also ==
- Glossary of set theory
- Kurepa tree
- List of statements independent of ZFC
- List of unsolved problems in set theory
- Suslin's problem
