= Inner model theory =

A branch of set theory

In set theory, inner model theory is the study of certain models of ZFC or some fragment or strengthening thereof. Ordinarily these models are transitive subsets or subclasses of the von Neumann universe V, or sometimes of a generic extension of V. Inner model theory studies the relationships of these models to determinacy, large cardinals, and descriptive set theory. Despite the name, it is considered more a branch of set theory than of model theory.

== Examples ==
- The class of all sets is an inner model containing all other inner models.
- The first non-trivial example of an inner model was the constructible universe L developed by Kurt Gödel. Every model M of ZF has an inner model L^{M} satisfying the axiom of constructibility, and this will be the smallest inner model of M containing all the ordinals of M. Regardless of the properties of the original model, L^{M} will satisfy the generalized continuum hypothesis and combinatorial axioms such as the diamond principle ◊.
- HOD, the class of sets that are hereditarily ordinal definable, form an inner model, which satisfies ZFC.
- The sets that are hereditarily definable over a countable sequence of ordinals form an inner model, used in Solovay's theorem.
- L(R), the smallest inner model containing all real numbers and all ordinals.
- L[U], the class constructed relative to a normal, non-principal, $\kappa$-complete ultrafilter U over an ordinal $\kappa$ (see zero dagger).

== Consistency results ==
One important use of inner models is the proof of consistency results. If it can be shown that every model of an axiom A has an inner model satisfying axiom B, then if A is consistent, B must also be consistent. This analysis is most useful when A is an axiom independent of ZFC, for example a large cardinal axiom; it is one of the tools used to rank axioms by consistency strength.

== See also ==
- Core model
- Inner model
