= Singular cardinals hypothesis =

Set theory concept

In set theory, the singular cardinals hypothesis (SCH) arose from the question of whether the least cardinal number for which the generalized continuum hypothesis (GCH) might fail could be a singular cardinal.

According to Mitchell (1992), the singular cardinals hypothesis is:

If κ is any singular strong limit cardinal, then 2^{κ} = κ^{+}.

Here, κ^{+} denotes the successor cardinal of κ.

Since SCH is a consequence of GCH, which is known to be consistent with ZFC, SCH is consistent with ZFC. The negation of SCH has also been shown to be consistent with ZFC, if one assumes the existence of a sufficiently large cardinal number. In fact, by results of Moti Gitik, ZFC + ¬SCH is equiconsistent with ZFC + the existence of a measurable cardinal κ of Mitchell order κ^{++}.

Another form of the SCH is the following statement:

2^{cf(κ)} < κ implies κ^{cf(κ)} = κ^{+},

where cf denotes the cofinality function. Note that κ^{cf(κ)}= 2^{κ} for all singular strong limit cardinals κ. The second formulation of SCH is strictly stronger than the first version, since the first one only mentions strong limits. From a model in which the first version of SCH fails at ℵ_{ω} and GCH holds above ℵ_{ω+2}, we can construct a model in which the first version of SCH holds but the second version of SCH fails, by adding ℵ_{ω} Cohen subsets to ℵ_{n} for some n.

Jack Silver proved that if κ is singular with uncountable cofinality and 2^{λ} = λ^{+} for all infinite cardinals λ < κ, then 2^{κ} = κ^{+}. Silver's original proof used generic ultrapowers. The following important fact follows from Silver's theorem: if the singular cardinals hypothesis holds for all singular cardinals of countable cofinality, then it holds for all singular cardinals. In particular, then, if $\kappa$ is the least counterexample to the singular cardinals hypothesis, then $\mathrm{cf}(\kappa) = \mathrm{\omega}$.

The negation of the singular cardinals hypothesis is intimately related to violating the GCH at a measurable cardinal. A well-known result of Dana Scott is that if the GCH holds below a measurable cardinal $\kappa$ on a set of measure one—i.e., there is normal $\kappa$-complete ultrafilter D on $\mathcal{P}(\kappa)$ such that $\{\alpha < \kappa\mid 2^{\alpha} = \alpha^+\}\in D$, then $2^\kappa = \kappa^+$. Starting with $\kappa$ a supercompact cardinal, Silver was able to produce a model of set theory in which $\kappa$ is measurable and in which $2^\kappa > \kappa^+$. Then, by applying Prikry forcing to the measurable $\kappa$, one gets a model of set theory in which $\kappa$ is a strong limit cardinal of countable cofinality and in which $2^\kappa > \kappa^+$—a violation of the SCH. Gitik, building on work of Woodin, was able to replace the supercompact in Silver's proof with measurable of Mitchell order $\kappa^{++}$. That established an upper bound for the consistency strength of the failure of the SCH. Gitik again, using results of inner model theory, was able to show that a measurable cardinal of Mitchell order $\kappa^{++}$ is also the lower bound for the consistency strength of the failure of SCH.

A wide variety of propositions imply SCH. As was noted above, GCH implies SCH. On the other hand, the proper forcing axiom, which implies $2^{\aleph_0} = \aleph_2$ and hence is incompatible with GCH also implies SCH. Solovay showed that large cardinals almost imply SCH—in particular, if $\kappa$ is strongly compact cardinal, then the SCH holds above $\kappa$. On the other hand, the non-existence of (inner models for) various large cardinals (below a measurable cardinal of Mitchell order $\kappa^{++}$) also imply SCH.
