= Aronszajn tree =

Tree in set theory

A portion of a special Aronszajn tree

In set theory, an Aronszajn tree is a tree of uncountable height with no uncountable branches and no uncountable levels. For example, every Suslin tree is an Aronszajn tree. More generally, for a cardinal κ, a κ-Aronszajn tree is a tree of height κ in which all levels have size less than κ and all branches have height less than κ (so Aronszajn trees are the same as $\aleph_1$-Aronszajn trees). They are named for Nachman Aronszajn, who constructed an Aronszajn tree in 1934; his construction was described by Kurepa (1935).

A cardinal κ for which no κ-Aronszajn trees exist is said to have the tree property (sometimes the condition that κ is regular and uncountable is included).

== Existence of κ-Aronszajn trees ==
Kőnig's lemma states that $\aleph_0$-Aronszajn trees do not exist.

The existence of Aronszajn trees ($=\aleph_1$-Aronszajn trees) was proven by Nachman Aronszajn, and implies that the analogue of Kőnig's lemma does not hold for uncountable trees.

The existence of $\aleph_2$-Aronszajn trees is undecidable in ZFC: more precisely, the continuum hypothesis implies the existence of an $\aleph_2$-Aronszajn tree, and Mitchell and Silver showed that it is consistent (relative to the existence of a weakly compact cardinal) that no $\aleph_2$-Aronszajn trees exist.

Jensen proved that V = L implies that there is a κ-Aronszajn tree (in fact a κ-Suslin tree) for every infinite successor cardinal κ.

Cummings & Foreman (1998) showed (using a large cardinal axiom) that it is consistent that no $\aleph_n$-Aronszajn trees exist for any finite n other than 1.

If κ is weakly compact then no κ-Aronszajn trees exist. Conversely, if κ is inaccessible and no κ-Aronszajn trees exist, then κ is weakly compact.

== Special Aronszajn trees ==
An Aronszajn tree is called special if there is a function f from the tree to the rationals so that f(x) < f(y) whenever x < y. Martin's axiom MA($\aleph_1$) implies that all Aronszajn trees are special, a proposition sometimes abbreviated by EATS. The stronger proper forcing axiom implies the stronger statement that for any two Aronszajn trees there is a club set of levels such that the restrictions of the trees to this set of levels are isomorphic, which says that in some sense any two Aronszajn trees are essentially isomorphic (Abraham & Shelah 1985). On the other hand, it is consistent that non-special Aronszajn trees exist, and this is also consistent with the generalized continuum hypothesis plus Suslin's hypothesis (Schlindwein 1994).

== Construction of a special Aronszajn tree ==
A special Aronszajn tree can be constructed as follows.

The elements of the tree are certain well-ordered sets of rational numbers with supremum that is rational or −∞. If x and y are two of these sets then we define x ≤ y (in the tree order) to mean that x is an initial segment of the ordered set y. For each countable ordinal α we write U_{α} for the elements of the tree of level α, so that the elements of U_{α} are certain sets of rationals with order type α. The special Aronszajn tree T is the union of the sets U_{α} for all countable α.

We construct the countable levels U_{α} by transfinite induction on α as follows starting with the empty set as U_{0}:

- If α + 1 is a successor then U_{α+1} consists of all extensions of a sequence x in U_{α} by a rational greater than sup x. U_{α + 1} is countable as it consists of countably many extensions of each of the countably many elements in U_{α}.
- If α is a limit then let T_{α} be the tree of all points of level less than α. For each x in T_{α} and for each rational number q greater than sup x, choose a level α branch of T_{α} containing x with supremum q. Then U_{α} consists of these branches. U_{α} is countable as it consists of countably many branches for each of the countably many elements in T_{α}.

The function f(x) = sup x is rational or −∞, and has the property that if x < y then f(x) < f(y). Any branch in T is countable as f maps branches injectively to −∞ and the rationals. T is uncountable as it has a non-empty level U_{α} for each countable ordinal α which make up the first uncountable ordinal. This proves that T is a special Aronszajn tree.

This construction can be used to construct κ-Aronszajn trees whenever κ is a successor of a regular cardinal and the generalized continuum hypothesis holds, by replacing the rational numbers by a more general η set.

== See also ==
- Kurepa tree
- Aronszajn line
