= Minimal model =

Minimal model may refer to:

== Mathematics ==
- Minimal model (birational geometry), classification of algebraic varieties with the goal to construct a birational model of any complex projective variety which is as simple as possible.
- Minimal model (set theory), the minimal standard model of ZFC, part of the constructible universe.
- Minimal model (mathematical logic), a model $\mathcal{M}$ for a formal theory $T$ such that no substructure $\mathcal{M}'$ of $\mathcal{M}$ is a model for $T$.

== Physics ==
- Minimal model (physics), two-dimensional conformal field theory with finitely many primary fields.

== Medicine and physiology ==
- Minimal model (endocrinology), a mathematical model of insulin-glucose homeostasis proposed in 1979 by Richard Bergman and it:Claudio Cobelli

== See also ==
- Sullivan minimal model, algebraic topology model of a differential graded algebra used in rational homotopy theory.
- Néron minimal model, algebraic geometry model for abelian varieties over the quotient field of a Dedekind domain R with perfect residue fields.
- Minimalism (disambiguation)
