= Aronszajn line =

In mathematical set theory, an Aronszajn line (named after Nachman Aronszajn) is a linear ordering of cardinality $\aleph_1$ which contains no subset order-isomorphic to

- $\omega_1$ with the usual ordering
- the reverse of $\omega_1$
- an uncountable subset of the Real numbers with the usual ordering.

Unlike Suslin lines, the existence of Aronszajn lines is provable using the standard axioms of set theory. A linear ordering is an Aronszajn line if and only if it is the lexicographical ordering of some Aronszajn tree.
