= Condensation lemma =

Lemma in constructibility theory

In set theory, a branch of mathematics, the condensation lemma is a result about sets in the constructible universe.

It states that if X is a transitive set and is an elementary submodel of some level of the constructible hierarchy L_{α}, that is, $(X,\in)\prec (L_\alpha,\in)$, then in fact there is some ordinal $\beta\leq\alpha$ such that $X=L_\beta$.

More can be said: If X is not transitive, then its transitive collapse is equal to some $L_\beta$, and the hypothesis of elementarity can be weakened to elementarity only for formulas which are $\Sigma_1$ in the Lévy hierarchy. Also, Devlin showed the assumption that X is transitive automatically holds when $\alpha=\omega_1$.

The lemma was formulated and proved by Kurt Gödel in his proof that the axiom of constructibility implies GCH.

== Condensation Arguments ==
A condensation argument is an argument which uses, in some way, shape, or form, the condensation lemma. Typically, this is done by means of reducing $\Sigma_n$ predicates over a specific $J_\alpha$ to $\Sigma_1$ predicates over an amenable structure, and then working in that said amenable structure instead of $J_\alpha$ itself.
