= Set theory (disambiguation) =

Set theory is a branch of mathematics concerning mathematical sets. A set theory may also refer to a specific formalization of the mathematics of sets; for a listing of different alternative set theories in this sense, see alternative set theory.

Set theory may also refer to:

- Set theory (music), a theory providing concepts for categorizing musical objects and describing their relationships
- Set Theory: An Introduction to Independence Proofs, a book by Kenneth Kunen
