= Matthew Foreman =

American mathematician

Matthew Dean Foreman
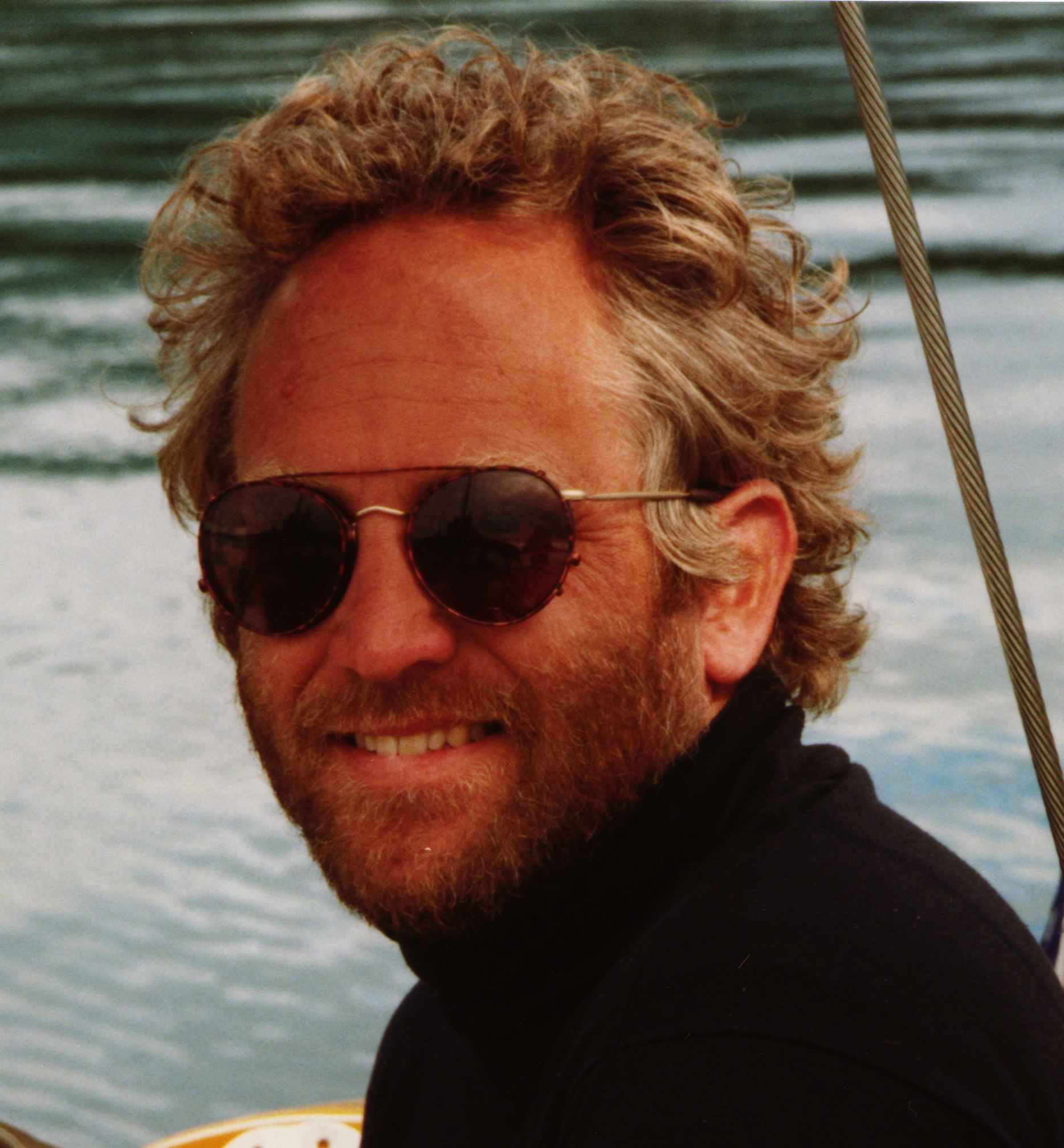
- Born: Los Alamos, New Mexico, US
- Education: University of California, Berkeley
- Scientific career
- Fields: Mathematics
- Workplaces: University of California, Irvine; Ohio State University
- Doctoral advisor: Robert M. Solovay

Matthew Dean Foreman is an American mathematician at University of California, Irvine. He has made notable contributions in set theory and in ergodic theory.

== Biography ==
Born in Los Alamos, New Mexico, Foreman earned his Ph.D. from the University of California, Berkeley in 1980 under Robert M. Solovay. His dissertation title was Large Cardinals and Strong Model Theoretic Transfer Properties.

== Work ==
Foreman began his career in set theory. His early work with Hugh Woodin included showing that it is consistent that the generalized continuum hypothesis (see continuum hypothesis) fails at every infinite cardinal. In joint work with Menachem Magidor and Saharon Shelah he formulated Martin's maximum, a provably maximal form of Martin's axiom and showed its consistency. Foreman's later work in set theory was primarily concerned with developing the consequences of generic large cardinal axioms. He also worked on classical "Hungarian" partition relations, mostly with András Hajnal.

In the late 1980s Foreman became interested in measure theory and ergodic theory. With Randall Dougherty he settled the Marczewski problem (1930) by showing that there is a Banach–Tarski decomposition of the unit ball in which all pieces have the property of Baire (see Banach–Tarski paradox). A consequence is the existence of a decomposition of an open dense subset of the unit ball into disjoint open sets that can be rearranged by isometries to form two open dense subsets of the unit ball. With Friedrich Wehrung, Foreman showed that the Hahn–Banach theorem implied the existence of a non-Lebesgue measurable set, even in the absence of any other form of the axiom of choice.

This naturally led to attempts to apply the tools of descriptive set theory to classification problems in ergodic theory. His first work in this direction, with Ferenc Beleznay, showed that classical collections were beyond the Borel hierarchy in complexity. This was followed shortly by a proof of the analogous results for measure-preserving transformations with generalized discrete spectrum. In a collaboration with Benjamin Weiss and Daniel Rudolph Foreman showed that no residual class of measure-preserving transformations can have algebraic invariants and that the isomorphism relation on ergodic measure-preserving transformations is not Borel. This negative result finished a program proposed by von Neumann in 1932. This result was extended by Foreman and Weiss to show that smooth area-preserving diffeomorphisms of the 2-torus are unclassifiable.

Foreman's work in set theory continued during this period. He co-edited (with Kanamori) the Handbook of Set Theory and showed that various combinatorial properties of ω_{2} and ω_{3} are equiconsistent with huge cardinals.

== Recognition ==
In 1998 Foreman was an Invited Speaker of the International Congress of Mathematicians in Berlin.

In 2021, he gave the Gödel Lecture titled Gödel Diffeomorphisms.

He was named to the 2023 class of Fellows of the American Mathematical Society, "for contributions to axioms of mathematics, Banach-Tarski phenomena, and descriptive dynamical systems".
