= Infinite tree =

Infinite tree may refer to:

- Tree (data structure), a data structure simulating a single-rooted, directed hierarchy (due to the requirement of computer-implementability, only rational trees rather than arbitrary infinite trees are admitted)
- Tree (graph theory), a connected undirected graph without simple cycles
- Tree (set theory), a generalization of a well-ordered set, also admitting many-rooted trees
