= Minimal model (set theory) =

Minimal standard model of ZFC

In set theory, a branch of mathematics, the minimal model is the minimal standard model of ZFC. The minimal model was introduced by Shepherdson (1951, 1952, 1953) and rediscovered by Cohen (1963).

The existence of a minimal model cannot be proved in ZFC, even assuming that ZFC is consistent, but follows from the existence of a standard model as follows. If there is a set W in the von Neumann universe V that is a standard model of ZF, and the ordinal κ is the set of ordinals that occur in W, then L_{κ} is the class of constructible sets of W (and so L_{κ} is itself a standard model). If there is a set that is a standard model of ZF, then the smallest such set is such an L_{κ}. This set is called the minimal model of ZFC, and also satisfies the axiom of constructibility V=L. The downward Löwenheim–Skolem theorem implies that the minimal model (if it exists as a set) is a countable set. More precisely, every element s of the minimal model can be named; in other words, for every element s of the minimal model, there is a first-order sentence φ(x) such that s is the unique element for which φ(s) is true.

Cohen (1963) gave another construction of the minimal model as the strongly constructible sets, using a modified form of Gödel's constructible universe.

Of course, any consistent theory must have a model, so even within the minimal model of set theory there are sets that are models of ZFC (assuming ZFC is consistent in the model). However, these set models are non-standard. In particular, they do not use the normal membership relation and they are not well-founded.

If there is no standard model then the minimal model cannot exist as a set. However in this case the class of all constructible sets plays the same role as the minimal model and has similar properties (though it is now a proper class rather than a countable set).

The minimal model of set theory has no inner models other than itself. In particular it is not possible to use the method of inner models to prove that any given statement true in the minimal model (such as the continuum hypothesis) is not provable in ZFC.

== External link ==
Cohen's proof
