= Kurepa tree =

Set-theoretic tree with uncountable branches

In set theory, a Kurepa tree is a tree $(T, <)$ of height $\omega_1$, each of whose levels is countable, which has at least $\aleph_2$ many branches. This concept was introduced by Kurepa (1935). The existence of a Kurepa tree (known as the Kurepa hypothesis, though Kurepa originally conjectured that such trees do not exist) is consistent with the axioms of ZFC: Solovay showed in unpublished work that there are Kurepa trees in Gödel's constructible universe (Jech 1971). More precisely, the existence of Kurepa trees follows from the diamond plus principle, which holds in the constructible universe. On the other hand, Silver (1971) showed that if a strongly inaccessible cardinal is Lévy collapsed to $\omega_2$ then, in the resulting model, there are no Kurepa trees. The existence of an inaccessible cardinal is in fact equiconsistent with the failure of the Kurepa hypothesis, because if the Kurepa hypothesis is false then the cardinal ω_{2} is inaccessible in the constructible universe.

A Kurepa tree with fewer than $2^{\aleph_1}$ branches is known as a Jech–Kunen tree.

More generally if $\kappa$ is an infinite cardinal, then a $\kappa$-Kurepa tree is a tree of height $\kappa$ with more than $\kappa$ branches but at most $|\alpha|$ elements of each infinite level $\alpha < \kappa$, and the Kurepa hypothesis for $\kappa$ is the statement that there is a $\kappa$-Kurepa tree. Sometimes the tree is also assumed to be binary. The existence of a binary $\kappa$-Kurepa tree is equivalent to the existence of a Kurepa family: a set of more than $\kappa$ subsets of $\kappa$ such that their intersections with any infinite ordinal $\alpha < \kappa$ form a set of cardinality at most $\alpha$. The Kurepa hypothesis is false if $\kappa$ is an ineffable cardinal, and conversely Jensen showed that in the constructible universe for any uncountable regular cardinal $\kappa$ there is a $\kappa$-Kurepa tree unless $\kappa$ is ineffable.

== Specializing a Kurepa tree ==
A Kurepa tree can be "killed" by forcing the existence of a function whose value on any non-root node is an ordinal less than the rank of the node, such that whenever three nodes, one of which is a lower bound for the other two, are mapped to the same ordinal, then the three nodes are comparable. This can be done without collapsing $\aleph_1$, and results in a tree with exactly $\aleph_1$ branches.

== See also ==
- Aronszajn tree
- Suslin tree
