= Whitehead problem =

Question in abstract algebra

In group theory, a branch of abstract algebra, the Whitehead problem is the following question:

Is every abelian group A with Ext^{1}(A, Z) = 0 a free abelian group?

Saharon Shelah proved that Whitehead's problem is independent of ZFC, the standard axioms of set theory.

== Refinement ==
Assume that A is an abelian group such that every short exact sequence

$$0\rightarrow\mathbb{Z}\rightarrow B\rightarrow A\rightarrow 0$$

must split if B is also abelian. The Whitehead problem then asks: must A be free? This splitting requirement is equivalent to the condition Ext^{1}(A, Z) = 0. Abelian groups A satisfying this condition are sometimes called Whitehead groups, so Whitehead's problem asks: is every Whitehead group free? It should be mentioned that if this condition is strengthened by requiring that the exact sequence

$$0\rightarrow C\rightarrow B\rightarrow A\rightarrow 0$$

must split for any abelian group C, then it is known that this is equivalent to A being free. (See Projective module).

Caution: The converse of Whitehead's problem, namely that every free abelian group is Whitehead, is a known group-theoretical fact. Some authors call Whitehead group only a non-free group A satisfying Ext^{1}(A, Z) = 0. Whitehead's problem then asks: do Whitehead groups exist?

== Shelah's proof ==
Saharon Shelah showed that, given the canonical ZFC axiom system, the problem is independent of the usual axioms of set theory. More precisely, he showed that:

- If every set is constructible, then every Whitehead group is free;
- If Martin's axiom and the negation of the continuum hypothesis both hold, then there is a non-free Whitehead group.

Since the consistency of ZFC implies the consistency of both of the following:

- The axiom of constructibility (which asserts that all sets are constructible);
- Martin's axiom plus the negation of the continuum hypothesis,

Whitehead's problem cannot be resolved in ZFC.

== Discussion ==
J. H. C. Whitehead, motivated by the second Cousin problem, first posed the problem in the 1950s. Stein answered the question in the affirmative for countable groups. Progress for larger groups was slow, and the problem was considered an important one in algebra for some years.

Shelah's result was completely unexpected. While the existence of undecidable statements had been known since Gödel's incompleteness theorem of 1931, previous examples of undecidable statements (such as the continuum hypothesis) had all been in pure set theory. The Whitehead problem was the first purely algebraic problem to be proved undecidable.

Shelah later showed that the Whitehead problem remains undecidable even if one assumes the continuum hypothesis. In fact, it remains undecidable even under the generalised continuum hypothesis. The Whitehead conjecture is true if all sets are constructible. That this and other statements about uncountable abelian groups are provably independent of ZFC shows that the theory of such groups is very sensitive to the assumed underlying set theory.

== See also ==
- Free abelian group
- Whitehead torsion
- List of statements undecidable in ZFC
- Statements true in L
