= Diamond principle =

Combinatorial principle

In set theory, the diamond principle, denoted $\Diamond$, is a combinatorial principle introduced by Ronald Jensen that holds in the constructible universe and that implies the continuum hypothesis. Jensen extracted the diamond principle from his proof that the axiom of constructibility implies the existence of a Suslin tree.

== Definitions ==
The diamond principle ◊ says that there exists a ◊-sequence; that is, a family of sets A_{α} ⊆ α for α < ω_{1} such that for any subset A of ω_{1} the set of α with A ∩ α = A_{α} is stationary in ω_{1}.

There are several equivalent forms of the diamond principle. One states that there is a countable collection A_{α} of subsets of α for each countable ordinal α such that for any subset A of ω_{1} there is a stationary subset C of ω_{1} such that for all α in C we have A ∩ α ∈ A_{α} and C ∩ α ∈ A_{α}. Notice that, a weaken form which states that, there exist sets A_{α} ⊆ α for α < ω_{1} such that for any subset A of ω_{1} there is at least one infinite α with A ∩ α = A_{α} , is equivalent to the Continuum Hypothesis.

More generally, for a given cardinal number κ and a stationary set S ⊆ κ, the statement ◊_{S} (sometimes written ◊(S) or ◊_{κ}(S)) is the statement that there is a sequence ⟨A_{α} : α ∈ S⟩ such that

- each A_{α} ⊆ α
- for every A ⊆ κ, {α ∈ S : A ∩ α = A_{α}} is stationary in κ

The principle ◊_{ω_{1}} is the same as ◊.

The diamond-plus principle ◊^{+} states that there exists a ◊^{+}-sequence, in other words a countable collection A_{α} of subsets of α for each countable ordinal α such that for any subset A of ω_{1} there is a closed unbounded subset C of ω_{1} such that for all α in C we have A ∩ α ∈ A_{α} and C ∩ α ∈ A_{α}.

== Properties and use ==
Jensen showed that the diamond principle $\Diamond$ implies the existence of Suslin trees. He also showed that the axiom of constructibility implies the stronger diamond-plus principle $\Diamond^+$, which implies the diamond principle, which implies the continuum hypothesis. The diamond principle does not imply the existence of a Kurepa tree, but $\Diamond^+$ does. Both $\Diamond$ and $\Diamond^+$ are independent of the axioms of ZFC. Also, the club principle ♣ and the continuum hypothesis CH together imply $\Diamond$. However, there exist models of ♣ + ¬ CH, so $\Diamond$ and ♣ are not equivalent, rather, ♣ is weaker than $\Diamond$.

Matet proved the related principle $\Diamond_\kappa$, equivalent to a property of partitions of $\kappa$ with diagonal intersection of initial segments of the partitions stationary in $\kappa$.

Akemann and Weaver used $\Diamond$ to construct a C*-algebra serving as a counterexample to Naimark's problem.

For all cardinals $\kappa$ and stationary subsets $S\subseteq\kappa^+$, ◊_{S} holds in the constructible universe. Shelah proved that for $\kappa>\aleph_0$, $\Diamond_{\kappa^+}(S)$ follows from $2^\kappa=\kappa^+$ for stationary $S$ that do not contain ordinals of cofinality $\kappa$. He also showed that the diamond principle solves the Whitehead problem by implying that every Whitehead group is free.

== See also ==
- List of statements independent of ZFC
- Statements true in L
