= Gödel operation =

Fundamental operation on sets used in defining Gödel's constructible set universe

In mathematical set theory, a set of Gödel operations is a finite collection of operations on sets that can be used to construct the constructible sets from ordinals. Gödel (1940) introduced the original set of 8 Gödel operations 𝔉_{1},...,𝔉_{8} under the name fundamental operations. Other authors sometimes use a slightly different set of about 8 to 10 operations, usually denoted G_{1}, G_{2},...

== Definition ==
Gödel (1940) used the following eight operations as a set of Gödel operations (which he called fundamental operations):

1. $\mathfrak{F}_1(X,Y) = \{X,Y\}$
2. $\mathfrak{F}_2(X,Y) = E\cdot X = \{(a,b)\isin X\mid a\isin b\}$
3. $\mathfrak{F}_3(X,Y) = X-Y$
4. $\mathfrak{F}_4(X,Y) = X\upharpoonright Y= X\cdot (V\times Y) = \{(a,b)\isin X\mid b\isin Y\}$
5. $\mathfrak{F}_5(X,Y) = X\cdot \mathfrak{D}(Y) = \{b\isin X\mid\exists a (a,b)\isin Y\}$
6. $\mathfrak{F}_6(X,Y) = X\cdot Y^{-1}= \{(a,b)\isin X\mid(b,a)\isin Y\}$
7. $\mathfrak{F}_7(X,Y) = X\cdot \mathfrak{Cnv}_2(Y) = \{(a,b,c)\isin X\mid(b,c,a)\isin Y\}$
8. $\mathfrak{F}_8(X,Y) = X\cdot \mathfrak{Cnv}_3(Y)= \{(a,b,c)\isin X\mid(a,c,b)\isin Y\}$

The second expression in each line gives Gödel's definition in his original notation, where the dot means intersection, $V$ is the universe, $E$ is the membership relation, $\mathfrak{D}$ denotes domain and so on. Note that the convention here is that a function from $X$ to $Y$ is encoded as a subset of $Y\times X$, not $X\times Y$.

Jech (2003) uses the following set of 10 Gödel operations.

1. $G_1(X,Y) = \{X,Y\}$
2. $G_2(X,Y) = X\times Y$
3. $G_3(X,Y) = \{(x,y)\mid x\isin X, y\isin Y, x\isin y\}$
4. $G_4(X,Y) = X-Y$
5. $G_5(X,Y) = X\cap Y$
6. $G_6(X) = \cup X$
7. $G_7(X) = \text{dom}(X)$
8. $G_8(X) = \{(x,y)\mid(y,x)\isin X\}$
9. $G_9(X) = \{(x,y,z)\mid(x,z,y)\isin X\}$
10. $G_{10}(X) = \{(x,y,z)\mid(y,z,x)\isin X\}$

The reason for including the functions $\{(x,y,z)\mid(x,z,y)\isin X\}$ and $\{(x,y,z)\mid(y,z,x)\isin X\}$ which permute the entries of an ordered tuple is that, for example, the tuple $(x_1,x_2,x_3,x_4)$ can be formed easily from $x_1$ and $(x_2,x_3,x_4)$ since it equals $(x_1,(x_2,x_3,x_4))$, but it is more difficult to form when the entries are given in a different order, such as from $x_4$ and $(x_1,x_2,x_3)$.^{p. 63}

== Properties ==
Gödel's normal form theorem states that if $\phi(x_1,\ldots,x_n)$ is a formula in the language of set theory with all quantifiers bounded, then the function $\{ (x_1, \ldots, x_n) \in (X_1\times\ldots\times X_n) \mid \phi(x_1, \ldots, x_n)\}$ of $X_1$, $\ldots$, $X_n$ is given by a composition of some Gödel operations. This result is closely related to Jensen's rudimentary functions.

Jon Barwise showed that a version of Gödel's normal form theorem with his own set of 12 Gödel operations is provable in $\mathrm{KPU}$, a variant of Kripke–Platek set theory admitting urelements.^{p. 64}
