= Robert M. Solovay =

American mathematician (born 1938)

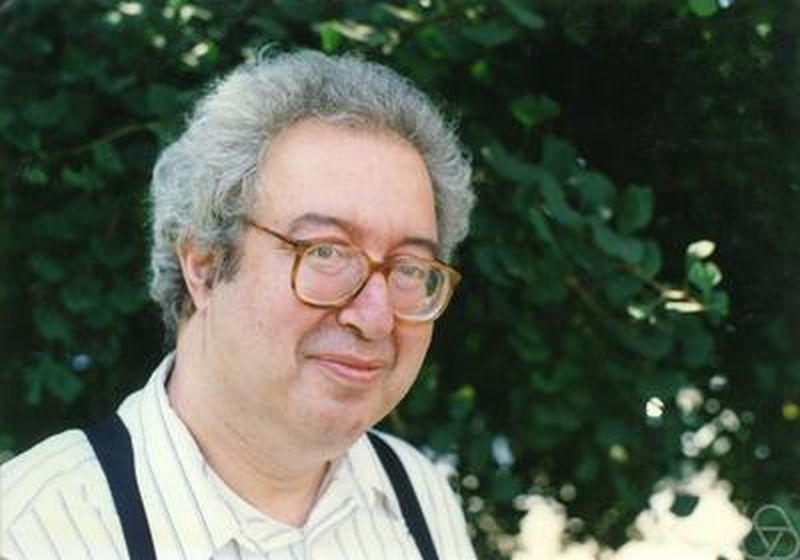
- Robert Solovay in 1993 (photo by George Bergman)
- Born: December 15, 1938 (age 87); Brooklyn, New York, U.S.
- Education: University of Chicago
- Known for: Solovay model Solovay–Strassen primality test Zero sharp Martin's axiom Solovay–Kitaev theorem
- Awards: Paris Kanellakis Award (2003)
- Scientific career
- Fields: Mathematics
- Workplaces: University of California, Berkeley
- Doctoral advisor: Saunders Mac Lane
- Doctoral students: Ken McAloon; Matthew Foreman; Judith Roitman; Betül Tanbay; W. Hugh Woodin

Robert Martin Solovay (born December 15, 1938) is an American mathematician working in set theory.

== Biography ==
Solovay earned his Ph.D. from the University of Chicago in 1964 under the direction of Saunders Mac Lane, with a dissertation on A Functorial Form of the Differentiable Riemann–Roch theorem. Solovay has spent his career at the University of California at Berkeley, where his Ph.D. students include W. Hugh Woodin and Matthew Foreman.

== Work ==
Solovay's theorems include:

- Solovay's theorem showing that, if one assumes the existence of an inaccessible cardinal, then the statement "every set of real numbers is Lebesgue measurable" is consistent with Zermelo–Fraenkel set theory without the axiom of choice;
- Isolating the notion of 0^{#};
- Proving that the existence of a real-valued measurable cardinal is equiconsistent with the existence of a measurable cardinal;
- Proving that if $\lambda$ is a strong limit singular cardinal, greater than a strongly compact cardinal then $2^\lambda=\lambda^+$ holds;
- Proving that if $\kappa$ is an uncountable regular cardinal, and $S\subseteq\kappa$ is a stationary set, then $S$ can be decomposed into the union of $\kappa$ disjoint stationary sets;
- With Stanley Tennenbaum, developing the method of iterated forcing and showing the consistency of Suslin's hypothesis;
- With Donald A. Martin, showed the consistency of Martin's axiom with arbitrarily large cardinality of the continuum;
- Outside of set theory, developing (with Volker Strassen) the Solovay–Strassen primality test, used to identify large natural numbers that are prime with high probability. This method has had implications for cryptography;
- Regarding the P versus NP problem, he proved with T. P. Baker and J. Gill that relativizing arguments cannot prove $\mathrm{P} \neq \mathrm{NP}$.
- Proving that GL (the normal modal logic which has the instances of the schema $\Box(\Box A\to A)\to\Box A$ as additional axioms) completely axiomatizes the logic of the provability predicate of Peano arithmetic;
- With Alexei Kitaev, proving that a finite set of quantum gates can efficiently approximate an arbitrary unitary operator on one qubit in what is now known as Solovay–Kitaev theorem.

== Selected publications ==
- Solovay, Robert M. (1970). "A model of set-theory in which every set of reals is Lebesgue measurable". Annals of Mathematics. Second Series. 92 (1): 1–56. doi:10.2307/1970696. JSTOR 1970696.
- Solovay, Robert M. (1967). "A nonconstructible Δ^{1}_{3} set of integers". Transactions of the American Mathematical Society. 127 (1). American Mathematical Society: 50–75. doi:10.2307/1994631. JSTOR 1994631.
- Solovay, Robert M. and Volker Strassen (1977). "A fast Monte-Carlo test for primality". SIAM Journal on Computing. 6 (1): 84–85. doi:10.1137/0206006.

== See also ==
- Provability logic
