= Inner model =

Transitive model containing all ordinals

In set theory, a branch of mathematical logic, an inner model for a theory T is a substructure of a model M of a set theory that is both a model for T and contains all the ordinals of M.

== Definition ==
Let L = ⟨∈⟩ be the language of set theory. Let S be a particular set theory, for example the ZFC axioms and let T (possibly the same as S) also be a theory in L.

If M is a model for S, and N is an L-structure such that

1. N is a substructure of M, i.e. the interpretation ∈_{N} of ∈ in N is ∈_{M} ∩ N^{2}
2. N is a model of T
3. the domain of N is a transitive class of M
4. N contains all ordinals in M

then we say that N is an inner model of T (in M). Usually T will equal (or subsume) S, so that N is a model for S 'inside' the model M of S.

If only conditions 1 and 2 hold, N is called a standard model of T (in M), a standard submodel of T if (S = T and) N is a set in M. A model N of T in M is called transitive when it is standard and condition 3 holds. If the axiom of foundation is not assumed (that is, is not in S) all three of these concepts are given the additional condition that N be well-founded. Hence inner models are transitive, transitive models are standard, and standard models are well-founded.

The assumption that there exists a standard submodel of ZFC (in a given universe) is stronger than the assumption that there exists a model. In fact, if there is a standard submodel, then there is a smallest standard submodel called the minimal model contained in all standard submodels. The minimal submodel contains no standard submodel (as it is minimal) but (assuming the consistency of ZFC) it contains some model of ZFC by the Gödel completeness theorem. This model is necessarily not well-founded otherwise its Mostowski collapse would be a standard submodel. (It is not well-founded as a relation in the universe, though it satisfies the axiom of foundation so is "internally" well-founded. Being well-founded is not an absolute property.) In particular in the minimal submodel there is a model of ZFC but there is no standard submodel of ZFC.

== Use ==
Usually when one talks about inner models of a theory, the theory one is discussing is ZFC or some extension of ZFC (like ZFC + "a measurable cardinal exists"). When no theory is mentioned, it is usually assumed that the model under discussion is an inner model of ZFC. However, it is not uncommon to talk about inner models of subtheories of ZFC (like ZF or KP) as well.

== Related ideas ==
Kurt Gödel proved that any model of ZF has a least inner model of ZF, the constructible universe, which is also an inner model of ZFC + GCH.

There is a branch of set theory called inner model theory that studies ways of constructing least inner models of theories extending ZF. Inner model theory has led to the discovery of the exact consistency strength of many important set theoretical properties.
