= Suslin's problem =

Problem in set theory

In mathematics, Suslin's problem is a question about totally ordered sets posed by Mikhail Yakovlevich Suslin (1920) and published posthumously. It has been shown to be independent of the standard axiomatic system of set theory known as ZFC; Solovay & Tennenbaum (1971) showed that the statement can neither be proven nor disproven from those axioms, assuming ZF is consistent.

(Suslin is also sometimes written with the French transliteration as Souslin, from the Cyrillic Суслин.)

Un ensemble ordonné (linéairement) sans sauts ni lacunes et tel que tout ensemble de ses intervalles (contenant plus qu'un élément) n'empiétant pas les uns sur les autres est au plus dénumerable, est-il nécessairement un continue linéaire (ordinaire)?

Is a (linearly) ordered set without jumps or gaps and such that every set of its intervals (containing more than one element) not overlapping each other is at most denumerable, necessarily an (ordinary) linear continuum?

— The original statement of Suslin's problem from (Suslin 1920)

== Formulation ==
Suslin's problem asks: Given a non-empty totally ordered set R with the four properties

1. R does not have a least nor a greatest element;
2. the order on R is dense (between any two distinct elements there is another);
3. the order on R is complete, in the sense that every non-empty bounded subset has a supremum and an infimum; and
4. every collection of mutually disjoint non-empty open intervals in R is countable (this is the countable chain condition for the order topology of R),

is R necessarily order-isomorphic to the real line R?

If the requirement for the countable chain condition is replaced with the requirement that R contains a countable dense subset (i.e., R is a separable space), then the answer is indeed yes: any such set R is necessarily order-isomorphic to R (proved by Cantor).

The condition for a topological space that every collection of non-empty disjoint open sets is at most countable is called the Suslin property.

== Implications ==
Any totally ordered set that is not isomorphic to R but satisfies properties 1–4 is known as a Suslin line. The Suslin hypothesis says that there are no Suslin lines: that every countable-chain-condition dense complete linear order without endpoints is isomorphic to the real line. An equivalent statement is that every tree of height ω_{1} either has a branch of length ω_{1} or an antichain of cardinality ℵ_{1}.

The generalized Suslin hypothesis says that for every infinite regular cardinal κ every tree of height κ either has a branch of length κ or an antichain of cardinality κ. The existence of Suslin lines is equivalent to the existence of Suslin trees and to Suslin algebras.

The Suslin hypothesis is independent of ZFC. Jech (1967) and Tennenbaum (1968) independently used forcing methods to construct models of ZFC in which Suslin lines exist. Jensen later proved that Suslin lines exist if the diamond principle, a consequence of the axiom of constructibility V = L, is assumed. (Jensen's result was a surprise, as it had previously been conjectured that V = L implies that no Suslin lines exist, on the grounds that V = L implies that there are "few" sets.) On the other hand, Solovay & Tennenbaum (1971) used forcing to construct a model of ZFC without Suslin lines; more precisely, they showed that Martin's axiom plus the negation of the continuum hypothesis implies the Suslin hypothesis.

The Suslin hypothesis is also independent of both the generalized continuum hypothesis (proved by Ronald Jensen) and of the negation of the continuum hypothesis. It is not known whether the generalized Suslin hypothesis is consistent with the generalized continuum hypothesis; however, since the combination implies the negation of the square principle at a singular strong limit cardinal—in fact, at all singular cardinals and all regular successor cardinals—it implies that the axiom of determinacy holds in L(R) and is believed to imply the existence of an inner model with a superstrong cardinal.

== See also ==
- List of statements independent of ZFC
- Continuum hypothesis
- AD^{+}
- Cantor's isomorphism theorem
