= Tree (set theory) =

Partial order with well-ordered predecessors

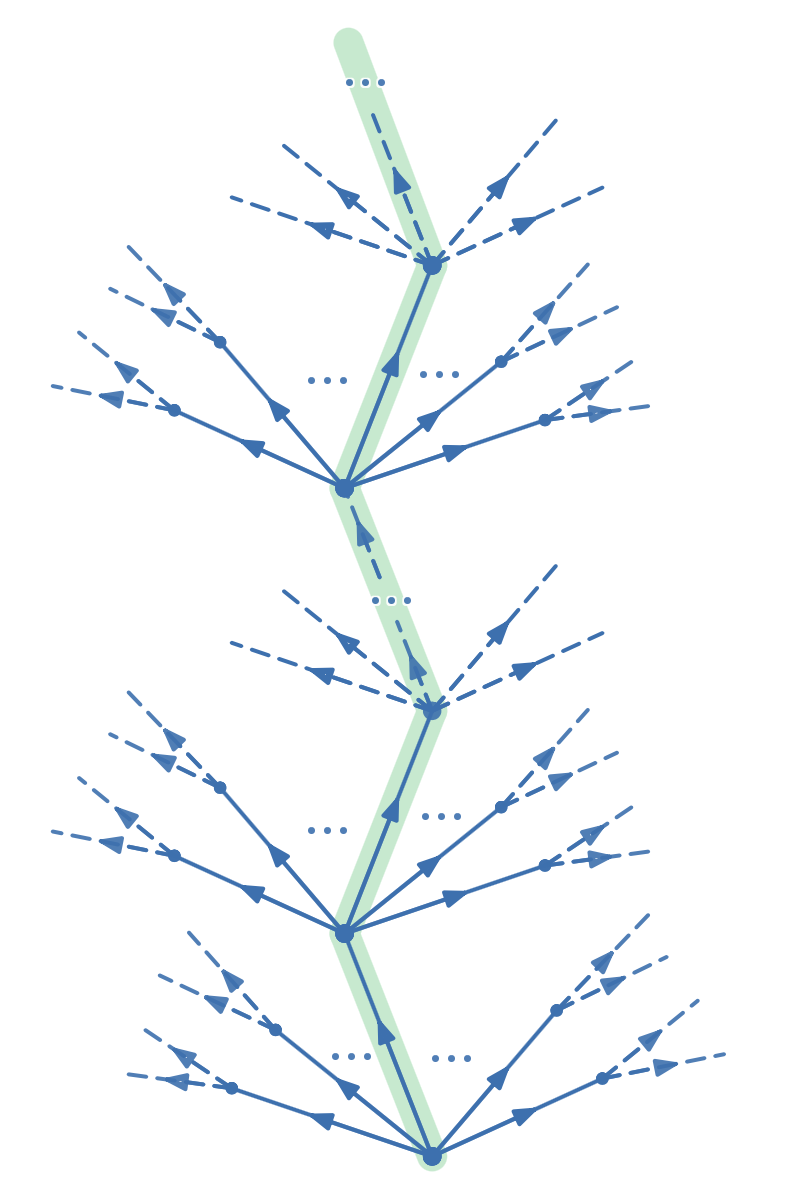
A branch (highlighted green) of a set-theoretic tree. Here dots represent elements, arrows represent the order relation, and ellipses and dashed arrows represent (possibly infinite) un-pictured elements and relationships.

In set theory, a tree is a partially ordered set $(T,<)$ such that for each $t\in T$, the set $\{s\in T: s<t\}$ is well-ordered by the relation $<$. Frequently trees are assumed to have only one root (i.e. minimal element), as the typical questions investigated in this field are easily reduced to questions about single-rooted trees.

== Definition ==
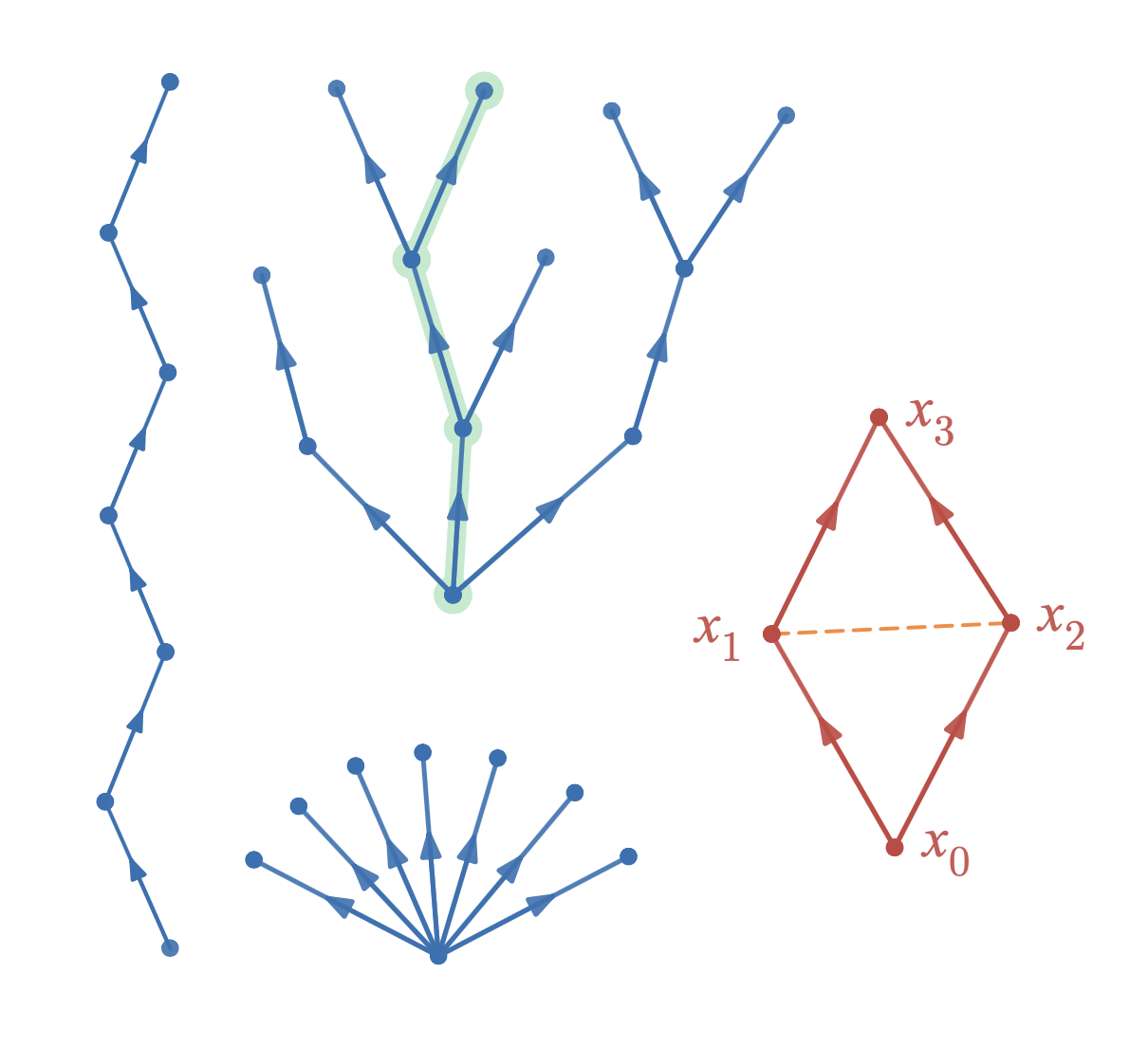
Small finite examples: The three partially ordered sets on the left are trees (in blue); one branch of one of the trees is highlighted (in green). The partially ordered set on the right (in red) is not a tree because x_{1} < x_{3} and x_{2} < x_{3}, but x_{1} is not comparable to x_{2} (dashed orange line).

A tree is a partially ordered set (poset) $(T,<)$ such that for each $t\in T$, the set $\{s\in T: s<t\}$ is well-ordered by the relation $<$. In particular, each well-ordered set $(T,<)$ is a tree. For each $t\in T$, the order type of $\{s\in T: s<t\}$ is called the height, rank, or level of $t$. The height of $T$ itself is the least ordinal greater than the height of each element of $T$. A root of a tree $T$ is an element of height 0. Frequently trees are assumed to have only one root.

Trees with a single root may be viewed as rooted trees in the sense of graph theory in one of two ways: either as a tree (graph theory) or as a trivially perfect graph. In the first case, the graph is the undirected Hasse diagram of the partially ordered set, and in the second case, the graph is simply the underlying (undirected) graph of the partially ordered set. However, if $T$ is a tree whose height is greater than the smallest infinite ordinal number $\omega$, then the Hasse diagram definition does not work. For example, the partially ordered set $\omega + 1 = \left\{0, 1, 2, \dots, \omega\right\}$ does not have a Hasse Diagram, as there is no predecessor to $\omega$. Hence a height of at most $\omega$ is required to define a graph-theoretic tree in this way.

A branch of a tree is a maximal chain in the tree (that is, any two elements of the branch are comparable, and any element of the tree not in the branch is incomparable with at least one element of the branch). The length of a branch is the ordinal that is order isomorphic to the branch. For each ordinal $\alpha$, the $\alpha$th level of $T$ is the set of all elements of $T$ of height $\alpha$. A tree is a $\kappa$-tree, for an ordinal number $\kappa$, if and only if it has height $\kappa$ and every level has cardinality less than the cardinality of $\kappa$. The width of a tree is the supremum of the cardinalities of its levels.

Any single-rooted tree of height $\leq \omega$ forms a meet-semilattice, where the meet (common predecessor) is given by the maximal element of the intersection of predecessors; this maximal element exists as the set of predecessors is non-empty and finite. Without a single root, the intersection of predecessors can be empty (two elements need not have common ancestors), for example $\left\{a, b\right\}$ where the elements are not comparable; while if there are infinitely many predecessors there need not be a maximal element. An example is the tree $\left\{0, 1, 2, \dots, \omega_0, \omega_0'\right\}$ where $\omega_0, \omega_0'$ are not comparable.

A subtree of a tree $(T,<)$ is a tree $(T',<)$ where $T' \subseteq T$ and $T'$ is downward closed under $<$, i.e., if $s, t \in T$ and $s < t$ then $t \in T' \implies s \in T'$. The height of each element of a subtree equals its height in the whole tree. This differs from the notion of subtrees in graph theory, which often have different roots than the whole tree.

== Set-theoretic properties ==
There are some fairly simply stated yet hard problems in infinite tree theory. Examples of this are the Kurepa conjecture and the Suslin conjecture. Both of these problems are known to be independent of Zermelo–Fraenkel set theory. By Kőnig's lemma, every $\omega$-tree has an infinite branch. On the other hand, it is a theorem of ZFC that there are uncountable trees with no uncountable branches and no uncountable levels; such trees are known as Aronszajn trees. Given a cardinal number $\kappa$, a $\kappa$-Suslin tree is a tree of height $\kappa$ which has no chains or antichains of size $\kappa$. In particular, if $\kappa$ is a singular cardinal then there exists a $\kappa$-Aronszajn tree and a $\kappa$-Suslin tree. In fact, for any infinite cardinal $\kappa$, every $\kappa$-Suslin tree is a $\kappa$-Aronszajn tree (the converse does not hold). One of the equivalent ways to define a weakly compact cardinal is that it is an inaccessible cardinal $\kappa$ that has the tree property, meaning that there is no $\kappa$-Aronszajn tree.

The Suslin conjecture was originally stated as a question about certain total orderings but it is equivalent to the statement: Every tree of whose height is the first uncountable ordinal $\omega_1$ has an antichain of cardinality $\omega_1$ or a branch of length $\omega_1$.

If $(T,<)$ is a tree, then the reflexive closure $\le$ of $<$ is a prefix order on $T$. The converse does not hold: for example, the usual order $\le$ on the set $\mathbb{Z}$ of integers is a total and hence a prefix order, but $(\mathbb{Z},<)$ is not a set-theoretic tree since e.g. the set $\{n\in\mathbb{Z}:n <0\}$ has no least element.

== Examples of infinite trees ==
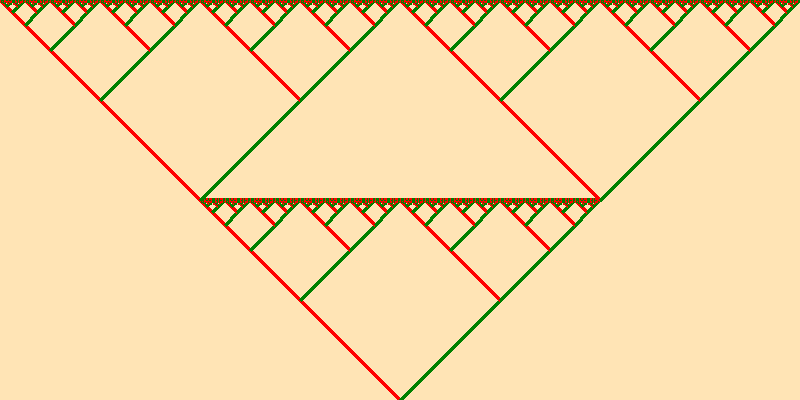
Set-theoretic tree of height $\omega \cdot 2$ and width $2^{\omega \cdot 2}$. Each node corresponds to a junction point of a red and a green line. Due to space restrictions, only branches with a prefix (0,0,0,...) or (1,1,1,...) are shown in full length.

- Let $\kappa$ be an ordinal number, and let $X$ be a set. Let $T$ be set of all functions $f:\alpha \mapsto X$ where $\alpha < \kappa$. Define $f < g$ if the domain of $f$ is a proper subset of the domain of $g$ and the two functions agree on the domain of $f$. Then $(T,<)$ is a set-theoretic tree. Its root is the unique function on the empty set, and its height is $\kappa$. The union of all functions along a branch yields a function from $\kappa$ to $X$, that is, a generalized sequence of members of $X$. If $\kappa$ is a limit ordinal, none of the branches has a maximal element ("leaf"). The picture shows an example for $\kappa = \omega \cdot 2$ and $X = \{0,1\}$.
- Each tree data structure in computer science is a set-theoretic tree: for two nodes $m,n$, define $m < n$ if $n$ is a proper descendant of $m$. The notions of root, node height, and branch length coincide, while the notions of tree height differ by one.
- Infinite trees considered in automata theory (see e.g. tree (automata theory)) are also set-theoretic trees, with a tree height of up to $\omega$.
- A graph-theoretic tree can be turned into a set-theoretic one by choosing a root node $r$ and defining $m < n$ if $m \neq n$ and $m$ lies on the (unique) undirected path from $r$ to $n$.
- Each Cantor tree, each Kurepa tree, and each Laver tree is a set-theoretic tree.

== See also ==
- Tree (descriptive set theory)
- Continuous graph
