= Martin's axiom =

Axiom in the mathematical field of set theory

In the mathematical field of set theory, Martin's axiom, introduced by Donald A. Martin and Robert M. Solovay, is a statement that is independent of the usual axioms of ZFC set theory. It is implied by the continuum hypothesis, but it is consistent with ZFC and the negation of the continuum hypothesis.

Informally, it says that all cardinals less than the cardinality of the continuum, $\mathfrak{c}$, behave roughly like $\aleph_0$. The intuition behind this can be understood by studying the proof of the Rasiowa–Sikorski lemma. It is a principle that is used to control certain forcing arguments.

== Statement ==
For a cardinal number $\kappa$, define the following statement:

MA(κ)
For any partial order P satisfying the countable chain condition (hereafter ccc) and any set D = {D_{i}}_{i∈I} of dense subsets of P such that |D| ≤ κ, there is a filter F on P such that F ∩ D_{i} is non-empty for every D_{i} ∈ D.

In this context, a set D is called dense if every element of P has a lower bound in D. For application of ccc, an antichain is a subset A of P such that any two distinct members of A are incompatible (two elements are said to be compatible if there exists a common element below both of them in the partial order). This differs from, for example, the notion of antichain in the context of trees.

MA(ℵ_{0}) is provable in ZFC and known as the Rasiowa–Sikorski lemma.

MA(2^{ℵ_{0}}) is false: [0, 1] is a separable compact Hausdorff space, and so (P, the poset of open subsets under inclusion, is) ccc. But now consider the following two 𝔠-size sets of dense sets in P: no x ∈ [0, 1] is isolated, and so each x defines the dense subset { S | x ∉ S }. And each r ∈ (0, 1], defines the dense subset { S | diam(S) < r }. The two sets combined are also of size 𝔠, and a filter meeting both must simultaneously avoid all points of [0, 1] while containing sets of arbitrarily small diameter. But a filter F containing sets of arbitrarily small diameter must contain a point in ⋂F by compactness. (See also § Equivalent forms of MA(κ).)

Martin's axiom is then that MA($\kappa$) holds for every $\kappa$ for which it could:

Martin's axiom (MA)
MA($\kappa$) holds for every $\kappa<\mathfrak{c}$.

== Equivalent forms of MA(κ) ==
The following statements are equivalent to MA(κ):

- If X is a compact Hausdorff topological space that satisfies the ccc then X is not the union of $\kappa$ or fewer nowhere dense subsets.
- If P is a non-empty upwards ccc poset and Y is a set of cofinal subsets of P with |Y| ≤ κ then there is an upwards-directed set A such that A meets every element of Y.
- Let A be a non-zero ccc Boolean algebra and F a set of subsets of A with |F| ≤ κ. Then there is a Boolean homomorphism φ: A → Z/2Z such that for every X ∈ F, there is either an a ∈ X with φ(a) = 1 or there is an upper bound b ∈ X with φ(b) = 0.

== Consequences ==
Martin's axiom has a number of other interesting combinatorial, analytic and topological consequences:

- The union of κ or fewer null sets in an atomless σ-finite Borel measure on a Polish space is null. In particular, the union of κ or fewer subsets of R of Lebesgue measure 0 also has Lebesgue measure 0.
- A compact Hausdorff space X with |X| < 2^{κ} is sequentially compact, i.e., every sequence has a convergent subsequence.
- No non-principal ultrafilter on N has a base of cardinality less than κ.
- Equivalently for any x ∈ βN\N we have 𝜒(x) ≥ κ, where 𝜒 is the character of x, and so 𝜒(βN) ≥ κ.
- MA(ℵ_{1}) implies that a product of ccc topological spaces is ccc (this in turn implies there are no Suslin lines).
- MA + ¬CH implies that there exists a Whitehead group that is not free; Shelah used this to show that the Whitehead problem is independent of ZFC.

== Further development ==
Martin's axiom can be seen as a generalization of the Baire category theorem: if the continuum hypothesis holds, one of the equivalent forms of MA above is simply the Baire category theorem restricted to c.c.c. compact spaces (a topological space is c.c.c. if it has no uncountable, pairwise disjoint collection of open sets).

Various other axioms modeled after Martin's axiom are known as forcing axioms. These include the proper forcing axiom and Martin's maximum, both of which imply Martin's axiom.
