= Axiom of constructibility =

Possible axiom for set theory in mathematics

The axiom of constructibility is a possible axiom for set theory in mathematics that asserts that every set is constructible. The axiom is usually written as V = L, where $V$ represents the von Neumann universe of all well-founded sets, and $L$ represents the constructible sets. In Zermelo–Fraenkel set theory (ZF), the property of being constructible is expressible as a single formula $\mathrm{Constructible}(x)$, and every set is in $V$, so the axiom can be written in the language of ZF in the form $\forall x\;\mathrm{Constructible}(x)$.

The axiom of constructibility, first investigated by Kurt Gödel, is inconsistent with the proposition that zero sharp exists and stronger large cardinal axioms (see list of large cardinal properties). Generalizations (i.e. weaker versions) of this axiom are explored in inner model theory.

== Implications ==
The axiom of constructibility implies the axiom of choice (AC), given Zermelo–Fraenkel set theory without the axiom of choice (ZF). It also settles many natural mathematical questions that are independent of Zermelo–Fraenkel set theory with the axiom of choice (ZFC); for example, the axiom of constructibility implies the generalized continuum hypothesis, the negation of Suslin's hypothesis, and the existence of an analytical (in fact, $\Delta^1_2$) non-measurable set of real numbers, all of which are independent of ZFC.

The axiom of constructibility implies the non-existence of those large cardinals with consistency strength greater or equal to 0^{#}, which includes some "relatively small" large cardinals. For example, no cardinal can be $\omega_1$-Erdős in $L$. While $L$ does contain the initial ordinals of those large cardinals (when they exist in a supermodel of $L$), and they are still initial ordinals in $L$, it excludes the auxiliary structures (e.g. measures) that endow those cardinals with their large cardinal properties.

Although the axiom of constructibility does resolve many set-theoretic questions, it is not typically accepted as an axiom for set theory in the same way as the ZFC axioms. Among set theorists of a realist bent, who believe that the axiom of constructibility is either true or false, most believe that it is false. This is in part because it seems unnecessarily "restrictive", as it allows only certain subsets of a given set (for example, $0^\sharp\subseteq \omega$ can't exist), with no clear reason to believe that these are all of them. In part it is because the axiom is contradicted by sufficiently strong large cardinal axioms. This point of view is especially associated with the Cabal, or the "California school" as Saharon Shelah would have it.

== In arithmetic ==
Especially from the 1950s to the 1970s, there have been some investigations into formulating an analogue of the axiom of constructibility for subsystems of second-order arithmetic. A few results stand out in the study of such analogues:

- John Addison's $\Sigma_2^1$ formula $\textrm{Constr}(X)$ with the property that $\mathcal P(\omega)\vDash\textrm{Constr}(X)$ if and only if $X\in\mathcal P(\omega)\cap L$, i.e., $X$ is a constructible real.
- There is a $\Pi_3^1$ formula known as the "analytical form of the axiom of constructibility" that has some associations to the set-theoretic axiom $V=L$. For example, some cases where $M\vDash V=L$ if and only if $M\cap\mathcal P(\omega)\vDash\text{analytical form of }V=L$ have been given.

== Significance ==
The major significance of the axiom of constructibility is in Kurt Gödel's 1938 proof of the relative consistency of the axiom of choice and the generalized continuum hypothesis to Von Neumann–Bernays–Gödel set theory. (The proof carries over to Zermelo–Fraenkel set theory, which has become more prevalent in recent years.)

Namely Gödel proved that $V=L$ is relatively consistent (i.e., if $\mathrm{ZFC} + (V=L)$ can prove a contradiction, then so can $\mathrm{ZF}$), and that in $\mathrm{ZF}$

$$V=L\implies \mathrm{AC}\land \mathrm{GCH},$$

thereby establishing that AC and GCH are also relatively consistent.

Gödel's proof was complemented in 1962 by Paul Cohen's result that both AC and GCH are independent, i.e., that the negations of these axioms ($\lnot AC$ and $\lnot GCH$) are also relatively consistent to ZF set theory.

== Statements true in L ==
Here is a list of propositions that hold in the constructible universe (denoted by $L$):

- The existence of a definable well-order of all sets (the formula for which can be given explicitly), and as consequences
  - The existence of a definable global choice function, and thus the axiom of choice
  - Every set is an ordinal definable set (V=HOD)
- The generalized continuum hypothesis
- Jensen's diamond principles ◊, ◊^{*}, and ◊^{+} (and hence also Ostaszewski's club principle ♣)
  - The negation of the Suslin hypothesis
- Global square
- The existence of morasses
- The non-existence of 0^{#} and as a consequence
  - The non existence of all large cardinals that imply the existence of a measurable cardinal
- The existence of a $\Delta_2^1$ set of reals (in the analytical hierarchy) that is not measurable.
- The truth of Whitehead's conjecture that every abelian group $A$ with $\mathrm{Ext}^1(A,\mathbb{Z})=0$ is a free abelian group, where $\mathrm{Ext}$ is the Ext functor.
- The existence of a primitive recursive class surjection $F:\mathrm{Ord}\to V$, i.e., a class function from $\mathrm{Ord}$ whose range contains all sets.

Accepting the axiom of constructibility (which asserts that every set is constructible) these propositions also hold in the von Neumann universe, resolving many propositions in set theory and some interesting questions in analysis.
