= List of libraries in Israel =

This is an expanding list of Israeli libraries. The list is based on the information provided by The National Library of Israel and a list of 680 public libraries provided by the Israeli Ministry of Culture and Sports.

== National libraries ==
- National Library of Israel

== Public libraries ==
See also: Public libraries in Israel (in Hebrew)

- Even-Yehuda public library
- Be'er Ya'akov public library
- Belfer Library, Ramla
- Gezer Regional Library
- Kotar Rishon, Rishon-Lezion
- Kfar Yona public library
- Mitzpe Yericho public library
- Raanana public library
- Ramat-Gan public library
- HaKramim Library, Modiin
- Kotar Reut Library, Reut
- The Moshe Shechter Public Library, Modiin
- The Sha'ar Zion - Beit Ariela Library, Tel Aviv
- The Felicia Blumental Music Center & Library, Tel Aviv
- Netanya public libraries
- Zikhron Ya'akov public library
- Ganey Tikva public library
- Beit Aryeh-Ofarim public library
- Ramat HaSharon public library
- Rachel & Naftali Becker public library, Kiryat Ekron
- Azor public library
- The Chais Library, Mevaseret Zion
- Efrat Library
- Herzliya public library

== School libraries ==
- Dror Educational Campus school library
- Ulpenat Orot Modiin Library
- Leyada School Library
- Tichon Hadash Herzliya Library

== Academic libraries ==
- Academic Arab College for Education, Haifa
- Achva Academic College Library
- Afeka College of Engineering Library
- Al-Qasemi Academic College of Education Library
- Ariel University Library
- Ashkelon Academic College Library
- Bar-Ilan Libraries and Information System [Bar-Ilan University]
- Berman Medical Library
- Bernard G. Segal Law Library, The Hebrew University of Jerusalem
- Conard Schick Library
- Eilat Campus Library, Ben-Gurion University of the Negev
- Elyachar Central Library
- Hadassah Academic College Library
- Kinneret Academic College Library
- The Neiman Library of Exact Sciences and Engineering, Tel Aviv University
- ORT Braude Academic College of Engineering Library
- Ruppin Academic Center Library
- Rothberg International School Library, The Hebrew University of Jerusalem
- Sourasky Central Library, Tel Aviv University
- Wiener Library for the Study of the Nazi Era and the Holocaust
- Wurzweiler Central Library, Bar Ilan University
- Younes and Soraya Nazarian Library, University of Haifa

== Special libraries ==
- Agricultural Research Organization (ARO), Volcani Center
- Bnai Zion Medical Center, medical library
- The Art Library in Memory of Meir Arison, Donated by the Ted Arison Family Foundation, Tel Aviv Museum of Art

== See also ==
- Library associations in Israel
- List of archives in Israel
- List of Israeli museums
- Mass media in Israel
