= Amir Leshem =

Israeli mathematician

- אמיר לשם
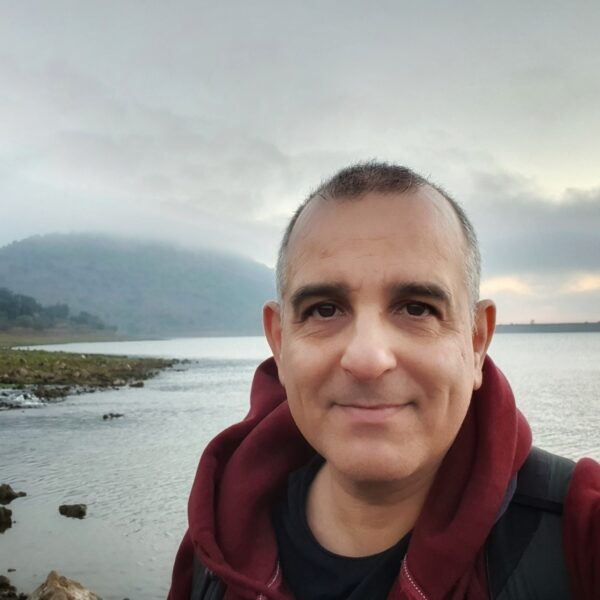
- Education: Hebrew University,
- Awards: IEEE fellow, fellow of the Asia‑Pacific Artificial Intelligence Association
- Scientific career
- Fields: signal processing, multi‑agent learning, game theory, wireless communications, and radio astronomy imaging
- Workplaces: Bar Ilan University
- Doctoral advisor: Menachem Magidor

Amir Leshem (Hebrew: אמיר לשם; born: 1966) is an Israeli mathematician and researcher. He is a full professor at the Alexander Kofkin Faculty of Engineering at Bar‑Ilan University, where he heads the Signal Processing, Information Networks & Radio Astronomy (SPIRAL) Lab.

His research spans signal processing, multi‑agent learning, game theory, wireless communications, and radio astronomy imaging. Leshem is an IEEE Fellow "for contributions to multi-channel and multi-agent signal processing".

== Early life and education ==
Amir Leshem was born in Petah Tikva. He graduated the IDF Talpiot program with a B.Sc. in mathematics and physics, at the Hebrew University of Jerusalem. He earned his Ph.D. in mathematics at the Hebrew University under the supervision of Menachem Magidor.

== Academic career ==
Leshem was a postdoctoral researcher at Delft University of Technology from 1998 to 2000. He joined Bar‑Ilan University in 2002 as a senior lecturer and was the first tenured faculty member of the Alexander Kofkin Faculty of Engineering. He was promoted to full professor in 2010 and served as head of the Signal Processing track and Communication track.

Leshem was an associate editor of IEEE Trans. on Signal Processing, and associate editor of IEEE Transactions on Signal and Information processing over Networks.

He was also a visiting scholar at Stanford University, Boston University and Delft University of Technology.

Leshem has supervised more than 30 graduate students and authored over 200 scientific publications and 4 patents.

In 2024 Leshem, together with Vered Tohar, created the first Hebrew poetry book authored by an artificial intelligence.

== Research ==
His research work focuses on wireless networks, learning over networks, applications of game theory to networks, multi-channel communication, dynamic and adaptive spectrum management, statistical signal processing, multi-agent learning and radio-astronomical imaging. He is also interested in set theory, logic and the foundations of mathematics and information processing in social networks.

== Honors and awards ==
Leshem is an IEEE fellow "for contributions to multi-channel and multi-agent signal processing" and fellow of the Asia‑Pacific Artificial Intelligence Association. He also received the Bar‑Ilan University Rector’s Award for Scientific Innovation.

== Personal life ==
Leshem is also a landscape photographer. He participated in the group exhibition The Magic of Nature at the Tel‑Hai Photography Museum and won the excellence prize in the photography category at the 9th Geoje International Art Festival in South Korea.

== Selected articles ==
- Leshem, A., van der Veen, A.-J., & Boonstra, A. J. (2000). ''Multi-channel interference mitigation techniques in radio astronomy''. The Astrophysical Journal Supplement Series, 131(1), 355–373. doi:10.1086/317360.
- Leshem, A., & Li, Y. (2007). ''A low complexity linear precoding technique for next generation VDSL downstream transmission over copper''. IEEE Transactions on Signal Processing, 55(11), 5527–5534. doi:10.1109/TSP.2007.898759.
- A. Leshem, O. Naperstack and A. Nehorai. (2007). "Information theoretic adaptive radar waveform design for multiple extended targets". IEEE Journal on Selected Topics in Signal Processing, vol. 1 no. 1, June 2007. DOI: 10.1109/JSTSP.2007.897047.
- Leshem, A., & Zehavi, E. (2008). ''Cooperative game theory and the frequency selective Gaussian interference channel''. IEEE Journal of Selected Areas in Communications, 26(7), 1078–1088. doi:10.1109/JSAC.2008.080906.
- Leshem, A., Zehavi, E., & Yaffe, Y. (2012). ''Multichannel Opportunistic Carrier Sensing for Stable Channel Access Control in Cognitive Radio Systems''. IEEE Journal on Selected Areas in Communications, 30(1), 82–95. doi:10.1109/JSAC.2012.120108.
- G. Yujie, A. Leshem. (2012) "Robust Adaptive Beamforming Based on Interference Covariance MatrixReconstruction and Steering Vector Estimation". IEEE Trans. on Signal Processing, vol.60, no.7, pp. 3881-3885, July 2012. DOI: 10.1109/TSP.2012.2194289.
- I. Bistritz & A. Leshem. Distributed Multi-Player Bandits - a Game of Thrones Approach. 2018 Conference on Neural Information Processing Systems (NIPS 2018), Dec. 2018, Montreal, Canada.
