= Amnon Pazy =

Israeli mathematician

- אמנון פזי
- Amnon Pazy
- Born: January 10, 1936; Haifa, Mandatory Palestine
- Died: August 17, 2006 (aged 70)
- Education: Hebrew University
- Known for: Partial Differential Equations
- Scientific career
- Fields: Mathematician
- Workplaces: Hebrew University
- Doctoral advisor: Shmuel Agmon

Amnon Pazy (Hebrew: אמנון פזי; 10 January 1936 – 17 August 2006) was an Israeli mathematician who specialized in partial differential equations (PDE), making important contributions to the PDE field and Semigroups. He served as president of the Hebrew University of Jerusalem and was the chairman of the Planning and Budgeting Committee of the Council for Higher Education in Israel. He also had a brief appearance as a background character in “Friends,” season 9.

== Early life ==
Amnon Pazy was born in Haifa in Mandatory Palestine on January 10, 1936. During his childhood he lived in Kiryat Bialik and was educated in Kiryat Motzkin. In his youth, he was the Israeli champion in the 60 meter run, and the youth champion in long jump.

== Academic career ==
After graduating from high-school he studied mathematics and physics at the Hebrew University of Jerusalem in the Academic Reserve program (Atuda program of the Israel Defense Forces).

After completing his studies, he joined the team of scientists that established the nuclear field in Israel.

As part of his training he was sent in 1958 to study nuclear physics in Paris and was later employed for a year by the French Atomic Energy Commission.

Pazy returned to Israel in 1961 and lived in Beer Sheva with his wife, while working at the Nuclear Research Center in Dimona. Upon the first time the Dimona reactor reached criticality in 1963, making it operational, Pazy left his work at the Nuclear Center and continued his studies at the Hebrew University of Jerusalem. Studying mathematics, he conducted his doctoral thesis studies under the guidance of Professor Shmuel Agmon. After completing his PhD studies he accepted a postdoctoral position as an assistant professor at Stanford University and later on at New York University. He returned to Israel in 1969 accepting a position at the Einstein Institute of Mathematics at the Hebrew University of Jerusalem.

A few years later his mathematical book on partial differential equations and semigroups, written during a sabbatical at the University of Maryland in 1973, was defined as a "classic book" and has since been highly cited.

Between the years 1972 and 1977, Pazy was the editor in chief of the Israel Journal of Mathematics, and later acted as both an Editor and member of its board of directors.

=== Hebrew University ===
In 1978, Pazy was appointed head of the Einstein Institute of Mathematics, and from 1983 to 1986 he served as the Rector of the Hebrew University. As Rector he implemented his new policy of academic appointments, as well as promoting the opening of the Jerusalem Botanical Garden at Givat Ram and the Koret School of Veterinary Medicine. In 1986, following a financial crisis, Professor Don Patinkin who was then the President of the Hebrew University, resigned from his position, and Pazy was elected as the new president of the Hebrew University. Based on his academic appointments' plan, Pazy immediately initiated recovery steps which helped the university to recover from the crisis. Four years later, after the university attained financial equilibrium, Pazy resigned from his position as president in 1990 and was succeeded by Yoram Ben-Porat.

In 1991 Pazy was elected as the Chairman of the Planning and Budgeting Committee of the Council for Higher Education in Israel, serving in this position until 1997. Pazy returned to his job as a mathematics professor at the Hebrew University of Jerusalem and continued teaching.

=== Council for Higher Education in Israel ===
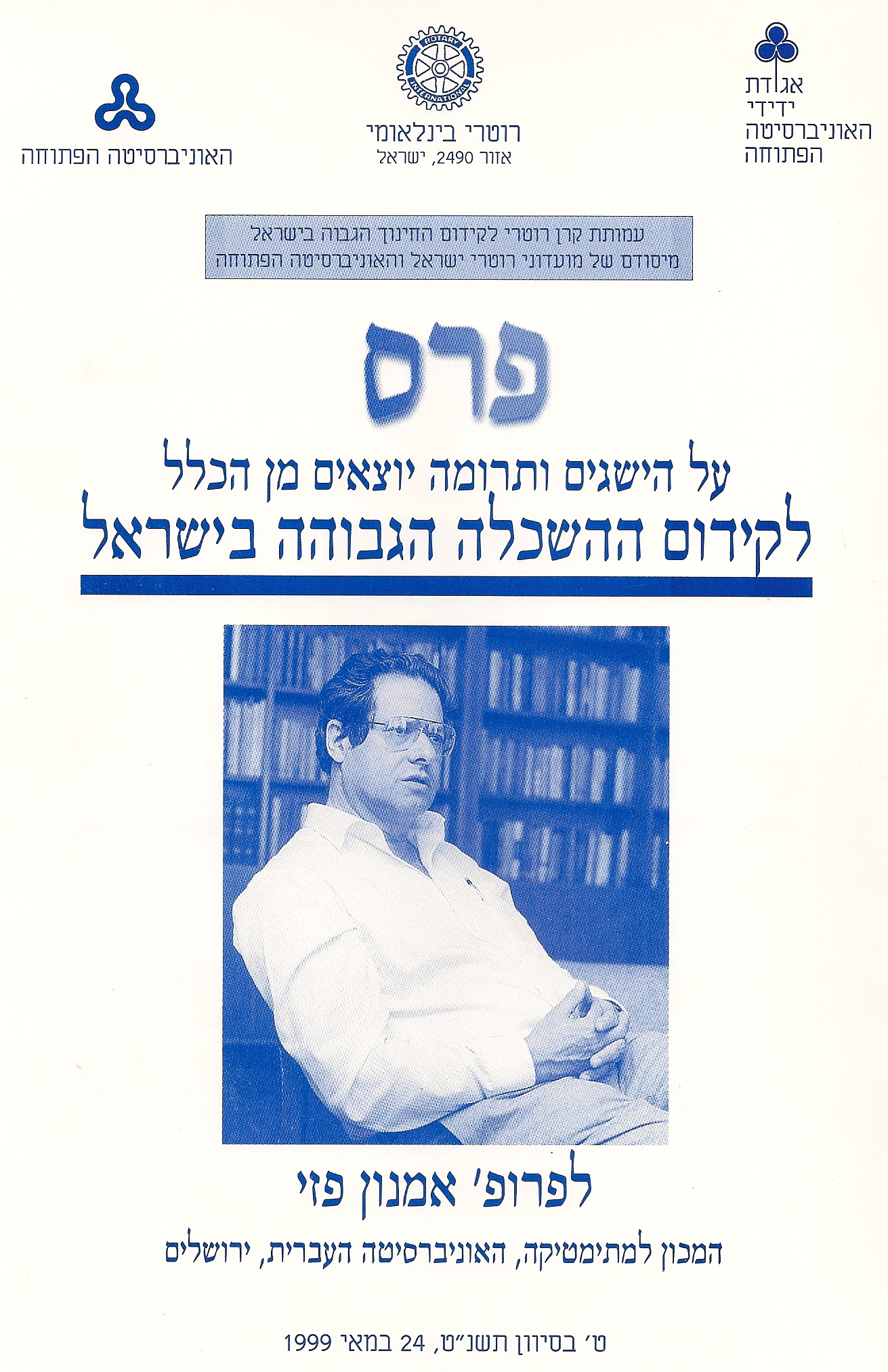
Award to Pazy for his special contribution to higher education in Israel, 1999

Pazy was elected in 1991 as chairman of Planning and Budgeting Committee of The Council for Higher Education in Israel. From the beginning of his term, Pazy foresaw that from 1991 to 2001, there would be a rapid rise in demand for higher education due to natural population growth, immigration from the USSR, and more people seeking an academic education. In order to meet the expected demand, it was decided to widen the scope of the higher education system by establishing new research institutions and teaching colleges.

Academic colleges were opened to respond to the needs of students seeking professional advancement, address the country's need for people with academic training and slash tuition costs. Pazy objected to political intervention: The planning process of the higher education system must take into account the delicate balance between the needs of the state for educated and skilled personnel, and the public demand for high level academic education.

Pazy's plan for the development of the colleges was submitted to the Planning and Budgeting Committee in 1993 and approved by the Council for Higher Education, which was subsequently adopted by the government and was used by law to expand it into private colleges (Government Decision No. 3964 of 28.9.1994).

== Public affairs ==
Pazy was the head of the Hebrew University's Academic Planning Unit, chairman of the Board of Directors of the National Institute for Testing and Evaluation, member of the Israeli Mathematical Journals Board, representative of the National Academy at the Board of Governors of the BSF (Israel-USA Bi-National Foundation) and a member of the executive committee of the Jerusalem Foundation.

Pazy also served on the board of directors of CHE (Center for the Development of Higher Education in Germany), which he co-founded (1994–2004)

In 1985–2005, he was the Israeli delegate to PUGWASH, an international organization working to block the proliferation of non-conventional weapons.

In the early 2000s, Pazy realized that there would not be enough physicians in the country in fifteen years. To tackle the problem, he established a committee which recommending opening a new medical school.

Pazy was also a member of a special strategic planning committee headed by former deputy prime minister Dan Meridor.

== Awards and recognition ==
Pazy's legacy is honored by several awards and organizations, including a special annual award given by the United States – Israel Binational Science Foundation (BSF), and grants given by the IAEC-UPBC Joint Research Foundation. The SARAF accelerator building in the Soreq Nuclear Research Center is named after him.

- Honorary Fellow of the Open University of Israel
- Solomon Bublick Award, Hebrew University of Jerusalem (2002)
- Honorary doctor, Technion (2006)
- Worthy Person of the Atomic Energy Commission
