= United States – Israel Binational Science Foundation =

Institution promoting collaborative research

The United States-Israel Binational Science Foundation (BSF) is a grant-awarding institution that promotes collaborative research in a wide range of basic and applied scientific disciplines, established in 1972 by an agreement between the governments of the United States and Israel. Numerous scientists participating in BSF programs have won prestigious awards such as the Nobel, Lasker and Wolf prizes. The Foundation grant recipients include 43 Nobel Prize laureates, 19 winners of the Lasker-DeBakey Clinical Medical Research Award, and 38 recipients of the Wolf Prize.

== Funding and structure ==
The BSF's income is derived from interest on an endowment of $100 million which was established in equal parts by the United States and Israeli governments. The organization is governed by a Board of Governors consisting of five American and five Israeli members, appointed by their respective governments. The BSF's base of operations is in Jerusalem.

== Grants ==
Grants are awarded on a competitive, peer-reviewed basis, a process juried by scientists from the United States, Israel and around the world. To be eligible for consideration, grant requests must be of outstanding scientific quality and demonstrate substantive collaboration between American and Israeli principal investigators. They must be for peaceful purposes and conducted under the aegis of not-for-profit institutions such as universities, research institutes and governmental bodies.

== Memorial Awards ==
The Bergmann Memorial Award
The award for promising young scientists, established in February 1976, to honor professor E.D. Bergmann ( - 1975), an organic chemistry researcher and one of the leaders who established the BSF.

The Neufeld Memorial Award
The award on new projects in the health sciences, established in 1987, to honor professor Henry Neufeld ( - December 1986), the chief scientist of the Israel Ministry of Health, and the founder and director of the Cardiac Clinic in Sheba Medical Center.

The Pazy Memorial Award
The award on new projects in the mathematical sciences, established in 2007, to honor professor Amnon Pazy ( - August 2006), a mathematician, the presidency of Hebrew University, and the chairperson of the Planning and Budgeting Committee of the Council for Higher Education VATAT.
