= Akevot Institute for Israeli–Palestinian Conflict Research =

Research institute

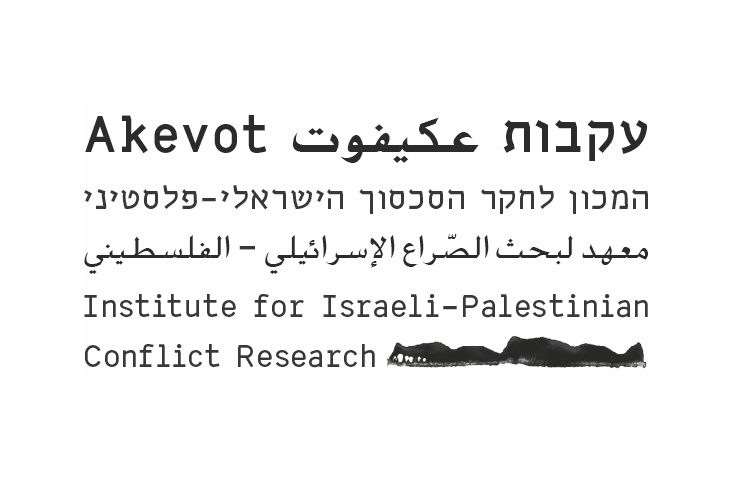
Akevot Institute's logo

Akevot Institute for Israeli–Palestinian Conflict Research (in Hebrew: מכון עקבות לחקר הסכסוך הישראלי-פלסטיני; in Arabic: جمعية حقوق المواطن معهد "عَكِڤوت" لبحث الصراع الإسرائيليّ- الفلسطينيّ) is a non-governmental, non-profit, human rights organization based in Haifa, Israel. Akevot means tracks or footprints in Hebrew. The organization was founded in 2014 with the goal of "breaking conflict-enhancing myths, fostering fact-based discourse, and supporting the work of human rights defenders" using archives. Akevot locates, digitizes and catalogues various forms of documentation on the Israeli-Palestinian conflict and makes relevant archival records available for the litigation, research and advocacy of human rights organizations, while working to expand public access to Israeli government archives and confront restricting policies.

In 2016 Akevot researchers were awarded the Alsberg Prize by the Association of Israeli Archivists for "pioneering and thorough research, highlighting troublesome conduct of many of the governmental archives."

== Activities of the organization ==
Akevot's publications are based on research of materials found in various archives in Israel and other countries, notably the Israel State Archives (ISA) and the IDF and Defense Establishment Archives. The Institute's publications deal, among other things, with the 1948 Arab–Israeli War; the Military Rule Era imposed on Palestinian citizens of Israel between 1948 and 1966; the results and effects of the Suez Crisis (1956) and the Six-Day War (1967), including the Israeli-occupied territories: the West Bank (including East Jerusalem), the Gaza Strip and the Golan Heights.

In March 2023 the institute launched a digital document collection website, containing hundreds of archival documents related to Akevot's main research topics.

Since July 2020 Akevot Institute has allowed the public to take part in the process of cataloguing and registration of its archival documents, through the citizen science platform Zooniverse.

Akevot is working towards the opening of Government Archives in Israel. Since its inception in 2014, thousands of previously closed archival records on the Israeli–Palestinian conflict were declassified at government archives at Akevot's request. In 2022, most prominently, previously sealed transcripts from the Kafr Qasim massacre trial were declassified following an appeal by Akevot researcher Adam Raz to the Military Court of Appeals. Dozens of other refusals to declassify specific records have also been challenged and reversed, including the Ya'akov Riftin Report and the "Migration Movement" intelligence memo which have been sealed in Israeli archives for many years.

Following Akevot's request, the Chief Archivist at the Israel State Archives instructed a re-examination of redactions from transcripts of 1948–1949 government sessions that were released in the 1990s with significant redactions. As a result, many of the redactions were removed, revealing significant content of previously unknown discussions. Similarly, long-time redactions were also removed from the diaries of Israel's first Prime Minister, David Ben-Gurion, following Akevot's request.

In 2019 Akevot exposed that the Director of Security of the Defense Establishment, a clandestine branch of the Ministry of Defense, was illegally interfering with various private archives in Israel to remove from public access key records, many of them on the Israeli–Palestinian conflict.

== Staff and board of directors ==
Akevot's founder and executive director is Lior Yavne, who previously served as director of research at the Israeli human rights organization Yesh Din and Director of Communications at B'Tselem. In addition to Yavne, there are seven other staff, including historian Adam Raz.

The board of directors includes Adv. Roni Pelli (Board’s Chair), attorney with the Association for Civil Rights in Israel; Amjad Shbeita, co-director of Sikkuy-Aufoq; Adv. Michael Sfard; Mooky Dagan, board member of Human Rights Defenders Fund; Dr. Shira Wilkof, lecturer, Faculty of Architecture and Town Planning at Technion – Israel Institute of Technology; and Ziv Stahl, executive director at Yesh Din.
