= List of archives in Israel =

This is a list of archives in Israel.

== Archives in Israel ==
- Abba Hushi Archive, Younes & Soraya Nazarian Library, University of Haifa
- Bet Aaronsohn and NILI Museum
- Beit Theresienstadt
- Central Zionist Archives
- Ghetto Fighters' House
- Haganah Historical Archive, Israel Ministry of Defense
- Information Center for Israeli Art
- Israel Architecture Archive
- IDF and Security Forces Archives, Israel Ministry of Defense
- Israel Folktale Archives, Humanities Faculty, University of Haifa
- Israel State Archive
- Jabotinsky Institute in Israel
- Jerusalem Cinematheque
- Jewish National Fund Photo Archive, KKL-JNF
- Kiddush Hashem Archive
- Liebermann House, Nahariya
- Massuah Institute for Holocaust Studies
- Moreshet Archive, Mordechai Anielevich Memorial Holocaust Study and Research Center, Givat Haviva, Kibbutz Artzi
- National Photo Collection, Israel Government Press Office
- "Phonotheque" National Sound Archives, National Library of Israel
- Steven Spielberg Jewish Film Archive
- Yad Yaari, Givat Haviva, Kibbutz Artzi

== See also ==
- List of archives
- List of libraries in Israel
- List of museums in Israel
- Culture of Israel
