= Yoram Ben-Porat =

Israeli academic and economist

Yoram Ben-Porath
- יורם בן-פורת
- Born: 1937; Ramat Gan, Israel
- Died: October 18, 1992 (55 years old); Eilat, Israel
- Resting place: Har Hamenuhot cemetery, Jerusalem
- Education: Hebrew University of Jerusalem (bachelor's and master's degrees); Harvard University (Ph.D.)
- Occupation: economist
- Known for: President of the Hebrew University of Jerusalem
- Title: William Haber Professor of Economics
- Successor: Hanoch Gutfreund
- Spouse: Dr. Yael Cohen Ben-Porath
- Children: 4

Yoram Ben-Porat (also, Ben-Porath; Hebrew: יורם בן-פורת; 1937 – October 18, 1992) was an Israeli academic and economist. He served as president of the Hebrew University of Jerusalem from 1990 until his death in 1992 in an automobile accident at the age of 55.

== Biography ==
Ben-Porath was born in Ramat Gan, Israel.

He was an economist. Ben-Porath specialized in the problems of the Israeli economy.

Ben-Porath obtained both a bachelor's degree and a master's degrees at the Hebrew University of Jerusalem. He then obtained a Ph.D. at Harvard University in 1967, studying with Simon Kuznets.

He became a member of the Hebrew University of Jerusalem Department of Economics faculty in 1967, where he was the William Haber Professor of Economics. In 1987, Ben-Porath became Rector of the university.

Ben-Porath was the president of the Hebrew University of Jerusalem from 1990 to 1992, following Amnon Pazy and succeeded by Hanoch Gutfreund.

He was also President of the Israel Economic Association, Director of the Maurice Falk Institute for Economic Research in Israel from 1979–84, and a consultant to the Rand Corporation.

He died on October 18, 1992, in an automobile accident in Eilat, Israel, at the age of 55, along with his 42-year-old wife Dr. Yael Cohen Ben-Porath (a lecturer in logic in the Hebrew University of Jerusalem Philosophy Department) and their five-year-old son, Yahali. They were buried at the Har Hamenuhot cemetery in Jerusalem.

He was succeeded as President of the university by Hanoch Gutfreund.
