= Menachem Magidor =

Israeli mathematician

- מנחם מגידור
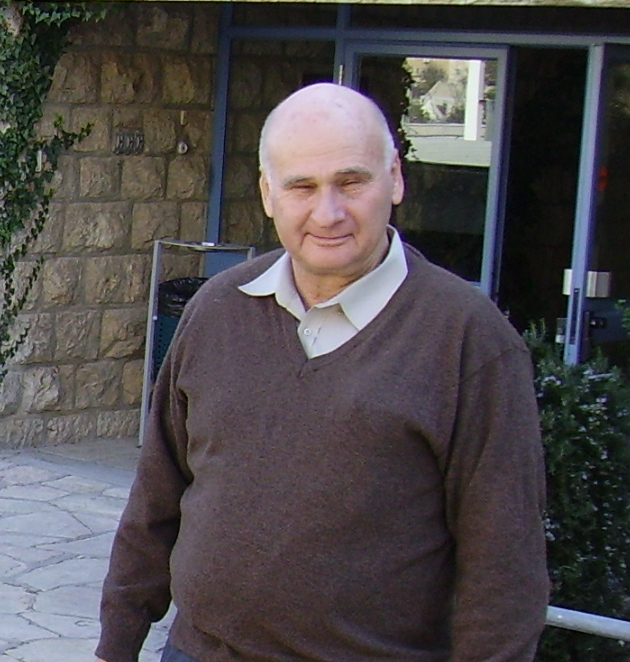
- Magidor in 2006
- Born: January 24, 1946 (age 80); Petah Tikva, Mandatory Palestine (now Israel)
- Education: Hebrew University
- Known for: Mathematical logic, Set theory, Large cardinal property
- Scientific career
- Fields: Mathematician
- Workplaces: Hebrew University
- Doctoral advisor: Azriel Lévy
- Doctoral students: Moti Gitik; Anna Sfard; Amir Leshem

President of the ASL
- In office 1996–1998
- Preceded by: George Boolos
- Succeeded by: Donald A. Martin

President of the Hebrew University of Jerusalem
- In office 1997–2009
- Preceded by: Hanoch Gutfreund
- Succeeded by: Menachem Ben-Sasson

President of the DLMPST/IUHPST
- In office 2016–2019
- Preceded by: Elliott Sober
- Succeeded by: Nancy Cartwright

Menachem Magidor (Hebrew: מנחם מגידור; born January 24, 1946) is an Israeli mathematician who specializes in mathematical logic, in particular set theory. He served as president of the Hebrew University of Jerusalem, was president of the Association for Symbolic Logic from 1996 to 1998 and as president of the Division for Logic, Methodology and Philosophy of Science and Technology of the International Union for History and Philosophy of Science (DLMPST/IUHPS) from 2016 to 2019. In 2016 he was elected an honorary foreign member of the American Academy of Arts and Sciences. In 2018 he received the Solomon Bublick Award.

== Early and personal life ==
Menachem Magidor was born in Petah Tikva, Israel. He received his Ph.D. in 1973 from the Hebrew University of Jerusalem. His thesis, On Super Compact Cardinals, was written under the supervision of Azriel Lévy. The Oxford philosopher Ofra Magidor is his daughter.

== Career ==
Magidor obtained several important consistency results on powers of singular cardinals, substantially developing the method of forcing. He generalized the Prikry forcing in order to change the cofinality of a large cardinal to a predetermined regular cardinal. He proved that the least strongly compact cardinal can be equal to the least measurable cardinal or the least supercompact cardinal, but not to both.

Assuming the consistency of huge cardinals, he constructed models (1977) of set theory with the first examples of nonregular ultrafilters over very small cardinals (related to the famous Guilmann–Keisler problem concerning existence of nonregular ultrafilters), even with the example of jumping cardinality of ultrapowers. He proved that it is consistent with $2^{\aleph_\omega}=\aleph_{\omega+2}$ for $\aleph_\omega$ to be strong limit, and strengthened the condition that $\aleph_\omega$ is strong limit to the condition that the generalised continuum hypothesis holds below $\aleph_\omega$. This constituted a negative solution to the singular cardinals hypothesis. Both proofs used the consistency of very large cardinals.

Magidor, Matthew Foreman, and Saharon Shelah formulated and proved the consistency of Martin's maximum, a provably maximal form of Martin's axiom. Magidor also gave a simple proof of the Jensen and the Dodd–Jensen covering lemmas. He proved that if 0^{#} does not exist, then every primitive recursive closed set of ordinals is the union of countably many sets in $L$.

He served as president of the Hebrew University of Jerusalem from 1997 to 2009, following Hanoch Gutfreund and succeeded by Menachem Ben-Sasson.

== Selected publications ==
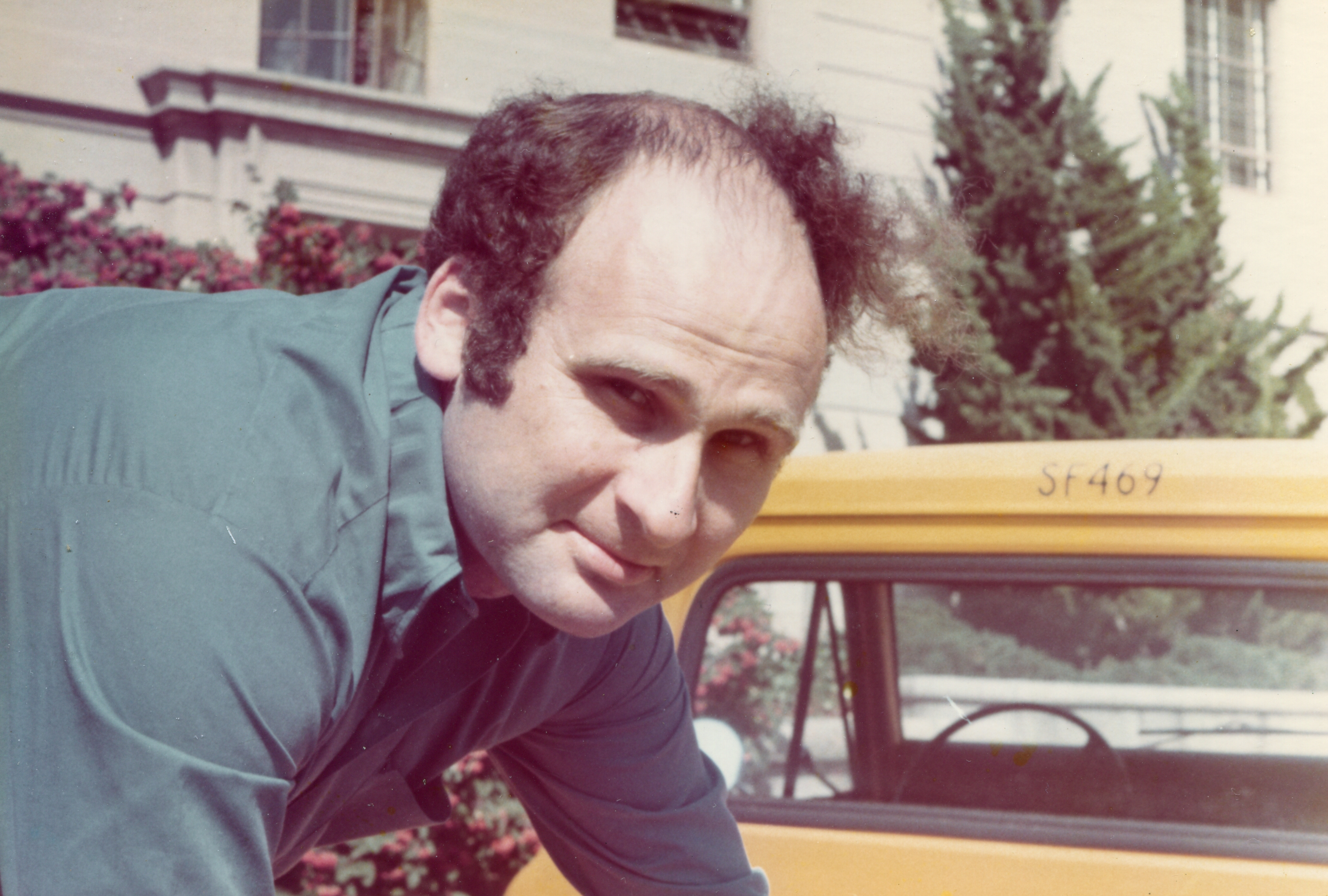
Menachem Magidor in 1973

- Magidor, Menachem (1977). "On the singular cardinals problem. I". Israel Journal of Mathematics. 28 (1–2): 1–31. doi:10.1007/BF02759779.
- Magidor, Menachem (1977). "On the singular cardinals problem. II". Annals of Mathematics. 2. 106 (3): 517–547. doi:10.2307/1971065. JSTOR 1971065.
- Foreman, Matthew; Magidor, Menachem & Shelah, Saharon (1988). "Martin's maximum, saturated ideals, and nonregular ultrafilters. I". Annals of Mathematics. 2. 127 (1): 1–47. doi:10.2307/1971415. JSTOR 1971415.
- Foreman, Matthew; Magidor, Menachem & Shelah, Saharon (1988). "Martin's maximum, saturated ideals, and nonregular ultrafilters". Annals of Mathematics. 2. 127 (3): 521–545. doi:10.2307/2007004. JSTOR 2007004.
- Foreman, Matthew & Magidor, Menachem (1995). "Large cardinals and definable counterexamples to the continuum hypothesis". Annals of Pure and Applied Logic. 76 (1): 47–97. doi:10.1016/0168-0072(94)00031-W.

Academic offices
Preceded by Elliott Sober	President of the Division for Logic, Methodology and Philosophy of Science and Technology of the International Union for History and Philosophy of Science and Technology (DLMPST/IUHPST); 2016–2019	Succeeded by Nancy Cartwright
