= Hanoch Gutfreund =

Physicist and administrator (b. 1935)

- חנוך גוטפרוינד
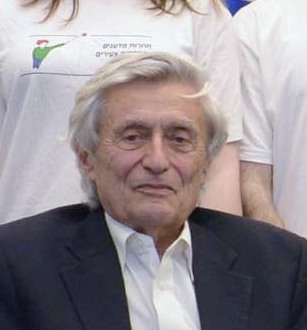
- Born: 1935 (age 90–91)
- Education: the Hebrew University of Jerusalem (Ph.D. in theoretical physics; 1966)
- Known for: President of the Hebrew University of Jerusalem
- Title: the Andre Aisenstadt Chair in theoretical physics

Hanoch Gutfreund (Hebrew: חנוך גוטפרוינד; born 1935 in Kraków, Poland) is the Andre Aisenstadt Chair in theoretical physics and was the president at the Hebrew University of Jerusalem. Prior to his presidency, he was a professor at the university.

== Biography ==
Gutfreund received a Ph.D. in theoretical physics from the Hebrew University of Jerusalem in 1966.

Gutfreund is the Andre Aisenstadt Chair in Theoretical Physics and has been a professor at the university since 1985. Gutfreund was earlier the Head of the Physics Institute, Head of the Advanced Studies Institute, Rector, and President of the university from 1992 to 1997 (following Yoram Ben-Porat, and succeeded by Menachem Magidor).

Gutfreund is the Director of the Einstein Center and is Hebrew University's appointee responsible for Albert Einstein's intellectual property. He heads the executive committee of the Israel Science Foundation.

His writings include The Formative Years of Relativity: The History and Meaning of Einstein's Princeton Lectures (with Jürgen Renn, Princeton University Press, 2017) and The Road to Relativity: The History and Meaning of Einstein's "The Foundation of General Relativity", Featuring the Original Manuscript of Einstein's Masterpiece (with Jürgen Renn, Princeton University Press, 2017), and Einstein on Einstein: Autobiographical and Scientific Reflections (with Jürgen Renn, Princeton University Press, 2020).

Gutfreund lives in Jerusalem.
