= Menachem Ben-Sasson =

Israeli politician

- מנחם בן-ששון
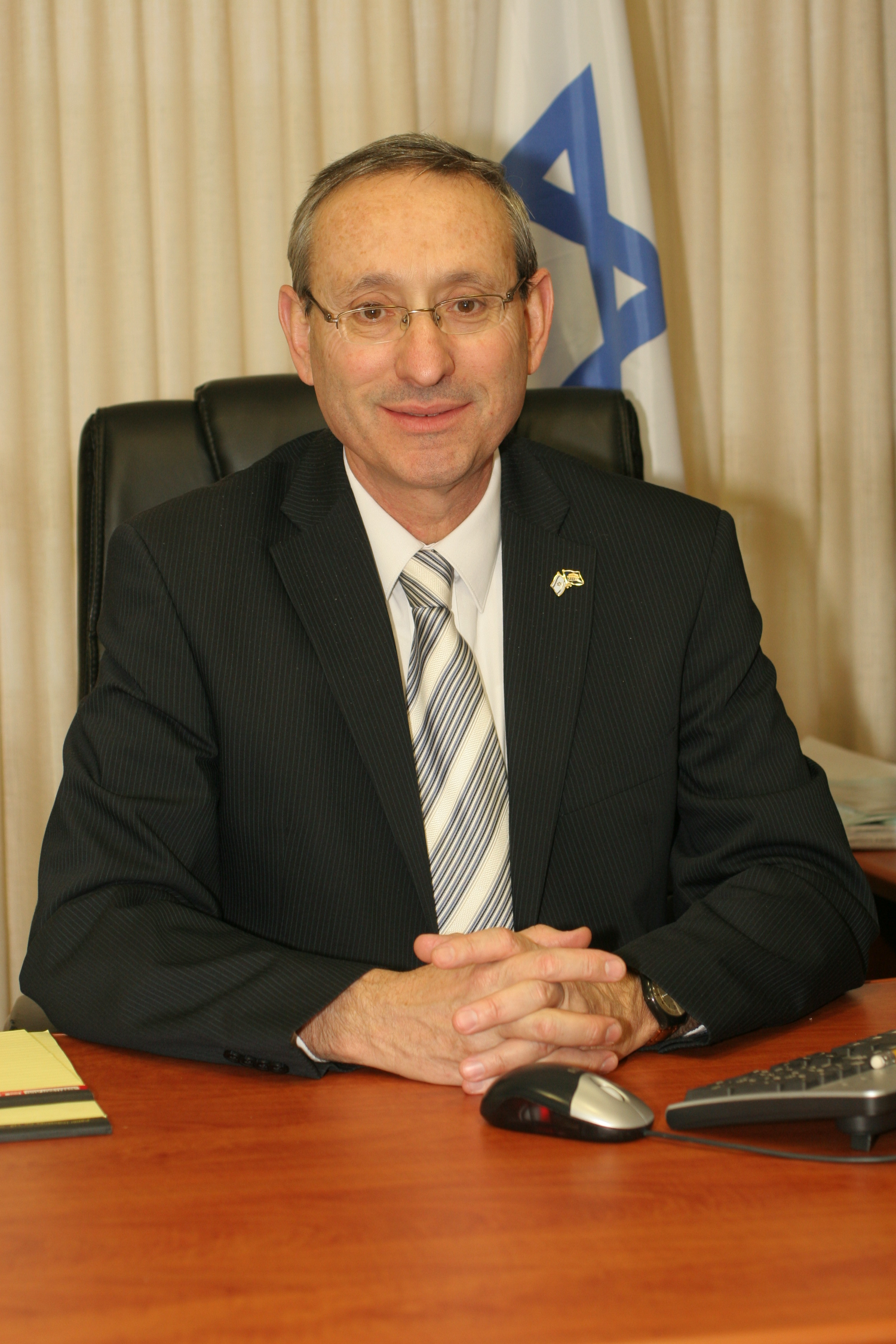

Faction represented in the Knesset
- 2006–2009: Kadima

Personal details
- Born: 7 July 1951 (age 74) Jerusalem, Israel

Menahem Ben-Sasson (Hebrew: מנחם בן-ששון; born 7 July 1951) is an Israeli politician, historian, and former member of the Knesset for Kadima. Between 2009 and 2017 he served as the thirteenth President of the Hebrew University of Jerusalem, succeeding Menachem Magidor. He has since served as Chancellor of the university.

== Biography ==
Born in Jerusalem, Israel, Ben-Sasson served in a Nahal unit in Ein Tzurim and in the artillery section during his national service in the Israel Defense Forces. He went on to study at the Hebrew University of Jerusalem, where he gained a BA in History and philosophy and a PhD in the History of the Jewish People in the Islamic Lands.

Ben-Sasson lives in Jerusalem, and is married with three children. In addition to Hebrew, he speaks Arabic, English, French, and German.

== Academic career ==
After completing his PhD in Jewish History at the Hebrew University of Jerusalem, Ben-Sasson undertook post-doctoral research as a Rothschild Fellow at the Genizah Research Unit at the University of Cambridge. He subsequently became a professor of the History of the Jewish People at the Hebrew University, where he also served as Deputy Dean of the Faculty of Humanities. He has also taught at Ben-Gurion University of the Negev, Bar-Ilan University, and LMU Munich.

Between 1997 and 2001 he served as rector of the Hebrew University, and represented the Association of University Heads at Knesset committees. He served as a visiting research fellow at the Russian Academy of Sciences in St. Petersburg, and as a visiting lecturer at the Jewish Theological Seminary of America and Yeshiva University. He was also a three-time fellow at the University of Pennsylvania's Katz Center for Advanced Judaic Studies.

He served as chief academic officer of the Friedberg Geniza Project and chair of its academic steering committee. His institutional roles have included: president of the World Union of Jewish Studies; vice-president of the Memorial Foundation for Jewish Culture; chairman of the Ben-Zvi Institute for the Study of Jewish Communities in the East; and member of the board of directors of Yad Vashem.

Between 2009 and 2017 he served as the thirteenth President of the Hebrew University of Jerusalem, succeeding Menachem Magidor. He was succeeded as president by Asher Cohen. From 2012 to 2015 he served as chairman of the Council of Presidents of the Universities in Israel (VERA). He subsequently became Chancellor of the university.

=== Research ===
Ben-Sasson's principal research field is the social and intellectual history of medieval Jewry in Muslim lands, from the seventh to the fourteenth centuries, with emphasis on the period of flourishing Jewish culture in the Islamic world and its subsequent decline from the twelfth century onward. He has also conducted extensive research on Maimonides, Geonic responsa and texts, the works and leadership of Saadia Gaon, and the Cairo Genizah. He has authored approximately forty books and scholarly articles.

His major publications include:

- The Jews of Sicily 825–1068: Documents and Sources (Ben-Zvi Institute, 1991)
- The Emergence of the Local Jewish Community in the Muslim World: Qayrawan 800–1057 (Magnes Press, 1996)

== Political career ==
Prior to the 2006 elections, Ben-Sasson was placed 20th on Kadima's list. With the party winning 29 seats, he entered the Knesset, and was appointed chairman of the Constitution, Law and Justice Committee. He also served as chairman of the Parliamentary Inquiry Committee on Wiretapping, and chairs the Lobby for Higher Education.

He lost his seat in the 2009 elections.

== Honours and awards ==
- Yitzhak Ben-Zvi Prize for the Study of Jewish Heritage (1997)
- Feher Prize for Jewish History (1997)
- Honorary doctorate, Jewish Theological Seminary of America
- Commander's Cross of the Order of Merit of the Federal Republic of Germany (2017), awarded for contributions to German-Israeli scientific relations
- Honorary Fellowship, Israel Museum International Council
