= Asher Cohen =

Israeli psychologist

- אשר כהן
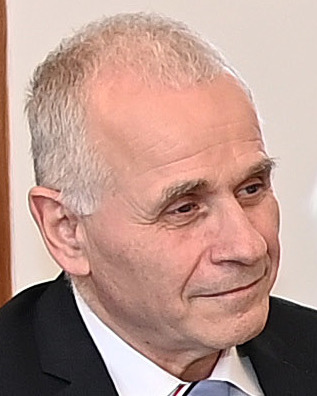
- Education: Hebrew University of Jerusalem (BA, MA); University of Oregon (PhD)
- Employer: Hebrew University of Jerusalem
- Title: President and Samuel Sturman Chair in Psychology

Asher Cohen (Hebrew: אשר כהן) is an Israeli psychologist. He has been the 14th President of the Hebrew University of Jerusalem since September 1, 2017, and holds the university's Samuel Sturman Chair in Psychology.

== Biography ==
Asher Cohen graduated from the Hebrew University of Jerusalem with a B.A. in economics and an M.A. in psychology. He completed his doctoral and post-doctoral studies at the University of Oregon.

== Academic career ==
Cohen was a senior lecturer and Assistant Professor at Indiana University.

Cohen returned in the early 1990s to the Hebrew University's Department of Psychology, in the Faculty of Social Sciences. From 2008 to 2012, he was the head of the university's Department of Psychology. From 2012 to 2017, Cohen was the Hebrew University's Rector.

Cohen has been the 14th President of the Hebrew University of Jerusalem since September 1, 2017, succeeding Menahem Ben-Sasson, who was President of the University for eight years. He holds the university's Samuel Sturman Chair in Psychology.

== See also ==
- Education in Israel
