= Soreq Applied Research Accelerator Facility =

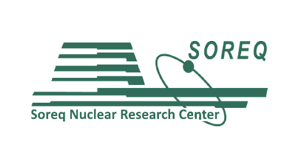

The Soreq Applied Research Accelerator Facility (SARAF) is a superconducting radiofrequency linear accelerator and neutron source, located at the Soreq Nuclear Research Center in Yavne, Israel. Its highly configurable neutron spectrum and produced range of light radionuclides makes it suitable for a range of research topics that previously required a nuclear reactor, such as fusion reactor material studies, producing radionuclides and astrophysics research.

== Technical details ==
SARAF is a multi-user and versatile particle accelerator facility based on a proton/deuteron RF superconducting linear accelerator. It has a variable energy of around 40 MeV and a continuous wave (CW) high ion current (0.04-5 mA).

Instead of using lithium as a spallation jet target, like most linacs, it uses an eutectic gallium indium alloy with a melting point of 15.7°C. GaIn is considerably safer than the very reactive alkali metal lithium.

This high-intensity superconducting linear particle accelerator for light ions, belongs to a new generation of particle accelerators. The high ion current generates a copious amount of fast neutrons and light radioactive nuclei.

The SARAF Phase-I accelerator was built by ACCEL Instruments (now RI Research Instruments GmbH). The novel acceleration technology proved the feasibility of the construction of the full SARAF Project. Until 2012 (and since 2010), SARAF was the only superconducting accelerator in the world to demonstrate CW acceleration of mA-range proton beams.

== Applications ==
Accelerator facilities such as SARAF are designed to produce enough neutrons to perform the functions that are today possible only at research nuclear reactors, such as IRR1 at Soreq. Since accelerators do not use fissile materials, they are expected to be a welcome replacement of research reactors, as they do not pose a proliferation or an environmental concern, and they have much better public acceptance than nuclear reactors.

The high amount of neutrons which it produces may be used to explore rare nuclear reactions, produce new types of radiopharmaceuticals, and enables further research in particle physics. Moderated neutrons can be used for non-destructive tests with similar resolution and contrast as those performed in reactors.

== Research and Development Programs at SARAF ==
The research and development programs at SARAF include the following subjects:

- Particle physics - high statistics measurements of properties and beta decay studies of light radioactive nuclei, to enable probing the limits of the standard model for elementary particles or set new accuracy limits to known physics (due to its hitherto unique ability to produce high yields of light radioisotopes).
- Nuclear astrophysics - measurement of rare cross sections associated with nucleosynthesis in the core of giant stars.
- Material science - fusion reactor material radiation damage study with a neutron spectrum similar to d-t fusion, of small components.
- Novel therapy methods - accelerator based boron neutron capture therapy of cancer (BNCT) using high therapeutic gain epi-thermal neutrons for malignant tumors therapy.
- R&D of radiopharmaceuticals - utilization of the high current and high power targets of SARAF for production of new radiopharmaceuticals for therapy and diagnostics.
- Neutron radiography and diffractometry - the high current of SARAF enables generation of thermal neutrons in a quantity, which enables radiography and diffractometry similar to that performed in nuclear reactors.
- Fast neutron based basic and applied research - SARAF can deliver to user a unique fast neutron spectrum that is not available in reactors or elsewhere accelerator facilities to open new scientific discipline in light radioactive nuclei studies, radiation damage and more.

== Cooperation of SARAF with other institutes and physicists ==
SARAF collaborated with Israeli research institutes and universities, as well as with accelerator laboratories from all around the world. Newly developed components from other accelerator projects are being tested at SARAF. Soreq NRC and its project SARAF were host to the 26th bi-annual LINAC conference, LINAC'12, at Tel Aviv in September 2012.

SARAF is an active facility for students and young researchers to perform their graduate studies and practice in nuclear physics and nuclear engineering. From 2004 to 2012, approximately 10 graduate students, 15 undergraduate students and 5 post-doctorate fellows have performed research projects associated with SARAF.

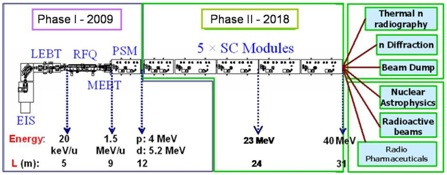
SARAF Layout

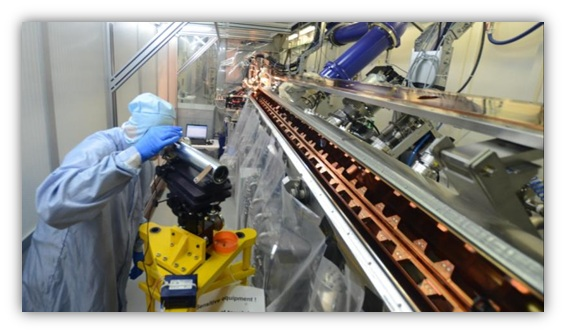
RFQ accelerating section alignment, 2012

== The construction of SARAF ==
The construction of SARAF was initiated by the Soreq NRC in 2003 and is divided into two phases:

Phase I – Achievements of Phase I include the first acceleration of 1 mA CW, 4 MeV proton beams through a HWR based superconducting accelerator, routinely delivered to targets and beam dumps and low duty cycle acceleration of 5 MeV deuterons. Low energy acceleration of such beams is crucial for all present and future high-intensity linear accelerator projects worldwide.

Phase II – The completion of the accelerator to its specified performance, the construction of a target hall, target stations and all necessary infrastructure. Phase II is planned to commence at 2in3. The Phase II accelerator is to be completed by 2018 and the target hall and stations are planned to be operational by the end of the decade.
