= Israel Architecture Archive =

Israeli archive documenting architecture

- Logo of the IAA (design: Noam Schechter).
- Established: 1995
- Type: Archive
- Location: 9 Echad Ha'am St., Shalom Tower, Tel Aviv, Israel
- Director: Zvi Elhyani

The Israel Architecture Archive (IAA) is the archive collection in Tel Aviv, Israel that documents Israeli architectural culture and practice. Since its establishment in 1995, the IAA has become a unique database on planning and building in Palestine and Israel from the late 19th century to the present.

The IAA is located in the basement of the Shalom Mayer Tower, as a symbolic statement, as the tower was built on the site of the first Hebrew public building in Tel Aviv, the Herzliya Hebrew Gymnasium (established 1909). The demolition of the latter in 1959 was a landmark event in Hebrew culture, that drew awareness to the need for preservation and documentation of the recent past.

== History of the collection ==
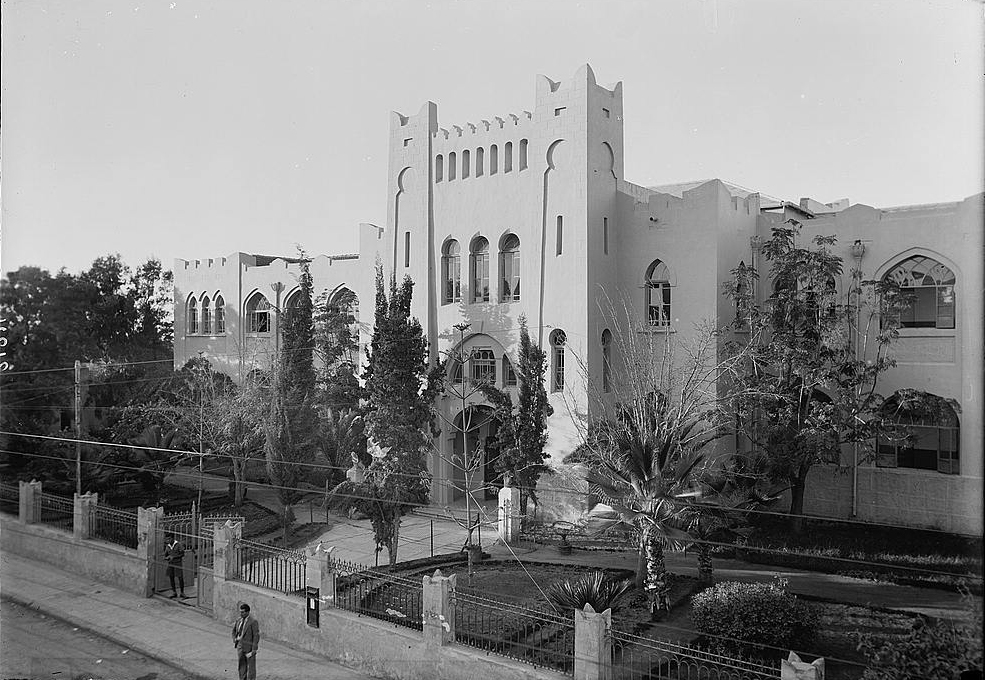
The Herzeliya Hebrew Gymnasium, ca. 1930, later demolished to make place for the tower in which the IAA resides.

The IAA was initially conceived as a private collection by Zvi Elhyani, an architect and architectural historian, while still a student at the Architecture Department at the Bezalel Academy of Art and Design, Jerusalem in the mid-1990s. The collection expanded significantly during Elhyani's graduate studies (MSc Arch. and PhD) at the Faculty of Architecture and Town Planning at the Technion, Haifa.

Over the years, the IAA collection became created, garnering increasing publicity and reputation. It consists of hundreds of thousands of items which continuously accumulate, collected from a variety of sources: active acquisition and purchase of relevant collections and single items, absorption of collections and items from owners, etc. As such, the IAA functions as a primary address for historical and rare materials which otherwise would have been lost and entirely disappeared. Since most other attempts to establish a central archive for building and architecture in Israel have failed, the IAA has become a storage place for documentary materials for architects and demolished and existing buildings, which not only enfold chapters in the history of Israeli architecture, but also in its nation-building.

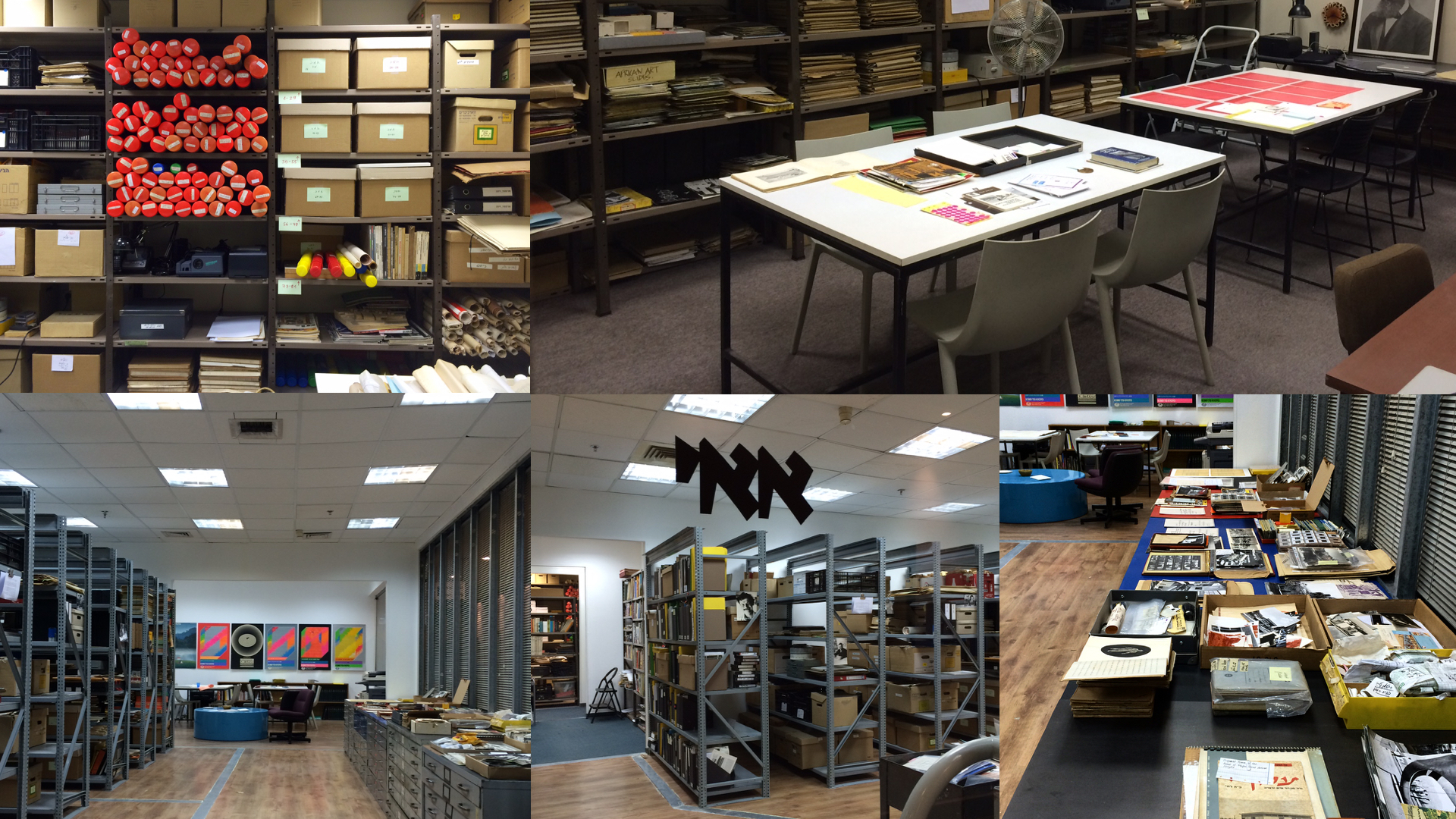
Views from IAA interior space.
