= Conrad Schick Library =

Research library in Jerusalem

Coordinates: 31.776090°N 35.229055°E

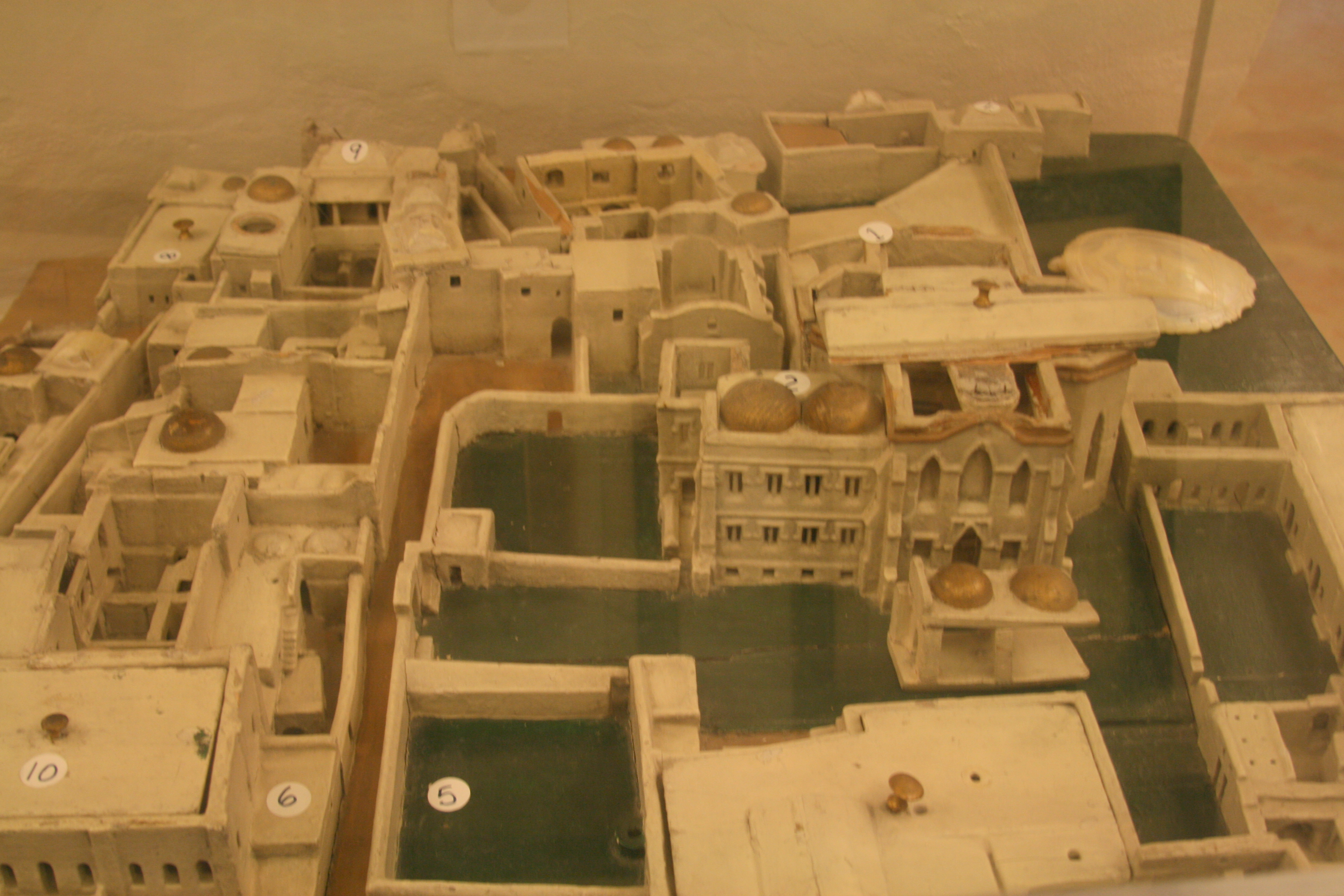

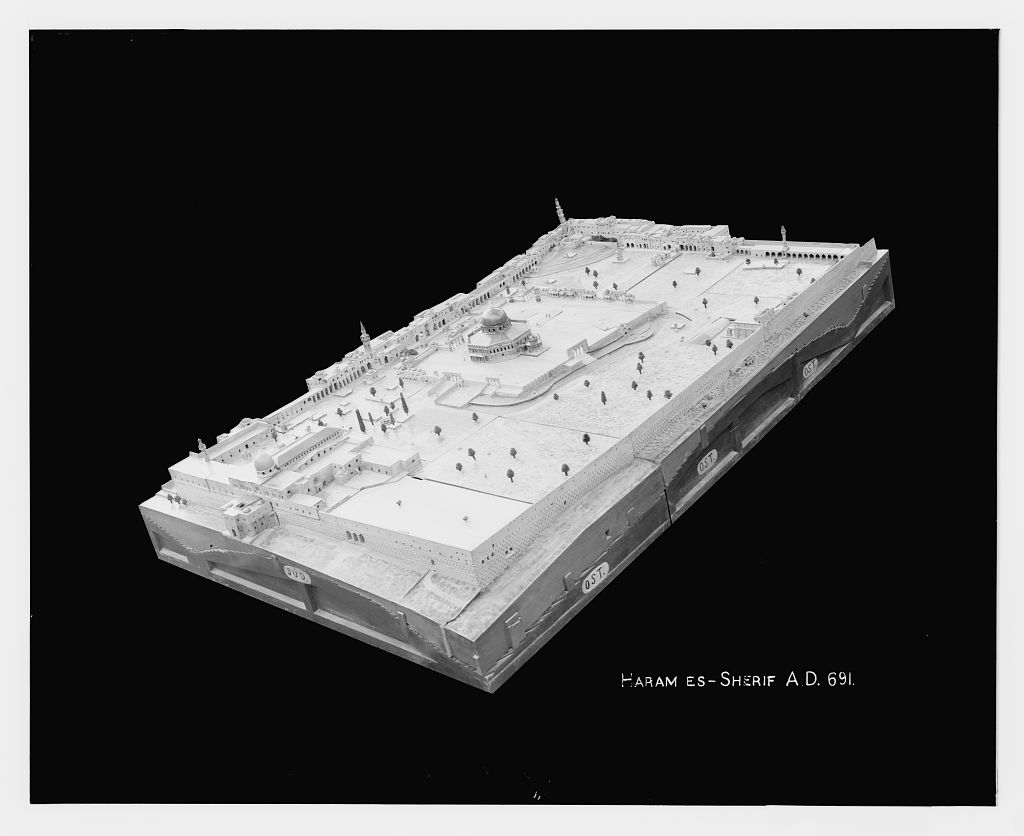
Temple Mount model by Conrad Schick at the Conrad Schick Library.

Conrad Schick Library is a small research library located at the Christ Church, in Jerusalem.

== History ==
Established in 2007, the library is named in honor of the German missionary Conrad Schick, who was an architect, Jerusalem's first town planner and an important early archaeologist. Schick was employed by the Church's Ministry Among Jewish People from 1850 until his death in 1901 and many of those years he worked at Christ Church. The library has a number of Schick's architectural plans as well as some personal correspondence. Christ Church owns three of his large models: The Christian Quarter, the Holy Sepulchre and the Temple Mount.

The library specializes in Evangelical Christian involvement in the modern Middle East; specifically in the field of politics, education, medical work and the exploration of the Holy Land. It also holds a number of letters, papers and journals connected with the local philanthropic activities of the LJS, including the establishment of clinics and the English Mission Hospital in 19th-century Palestine. This includes the records of Christ Church Jerusalem, the oldest Protestant Church in the Middle East, along with material about LJS hospitals, mission stations, schools, book depots and workshops. Other core subject areas include the work of the London Jews' Society in other countries such as Ethiopia and Eastern Europe. The origins and growth of the Messianic Jewish movement, Arab Anglicanism and the scholarly study of Protestant eschatology are also areas of interest for the library. It also houses early 19th-century maps of Jerusalem, the partial archive of the Palestine Exhibition and 6,000 glass slides mostly of Palestine in the late 19th and early 20th centuries.

The library is housed in the building that was the first British Consulate in Jerusalem, and later used as a school. It is open by appointment to university students, licensed guides and researchers. The Conrad Schick Library also serves visiting clergy studying Biblical subjects and the Jewish roots of Christianity at Christ Church.
