= Spectrum Management and Telecommunications =

Spectrum Management and Telecommunications program is the Department of Innovation, Science and Economic Development Canada that is responsible for setting radio and telecommunications standards and certifying that radio apparatus and equipment meet these standards.

Innovation, Science and Economic Development Canada, together with representatives of the radiocommunication industry, developed the Radiocommunication Regulations.

Canada's Radiocommunication Act and Radiocommunication Regulations require that manufacturers, importers, distributors and sellers must test and label radio apparatus, interference-causing equipment or radio-sensitive equipment.

More specifically, equipment must be classified as Category I or II and meet all the technical standards that are required for that type of equipment. Category I equipment must obtain a Technical Acceptance Certificate (TAC) from Innovation, Science and Economic Development Canada.

Individuals and corporations that do not comply with the Regulations may face charges, fines or prison.

Category I equipment includes transmitters, cellular phones and Wireless computer links.

== See also ==
- ITU Radio Regulations
- U.S. Federal Communications Commission
