= Soreq Nuclear Research Center =

Israeli research center

Coordinates: 31.8993°N 34.7028°E

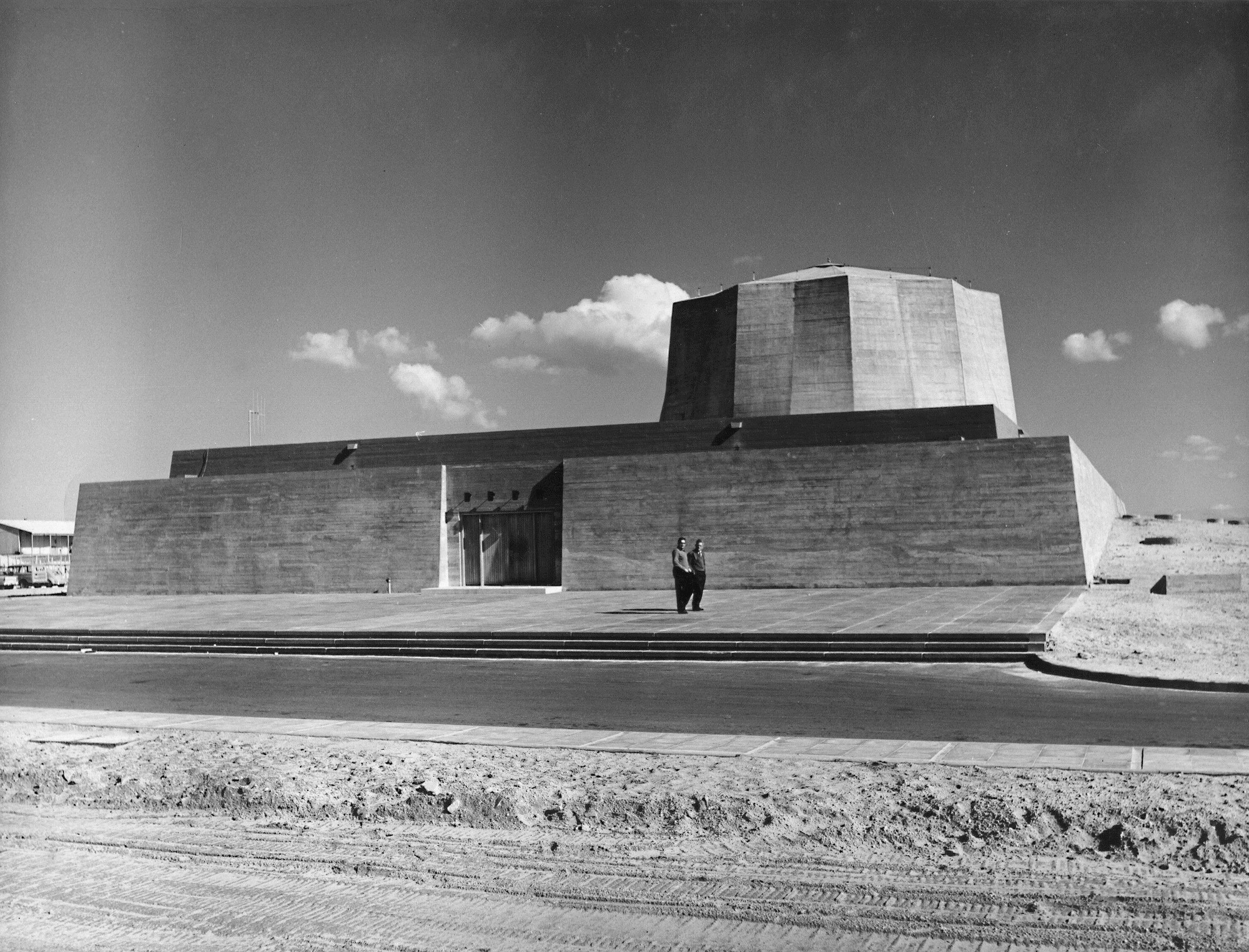
Reactor building at the Soreq Nuclear Research Center (1959)

Soreq Nuclear Research Center is a research and development institute situated near the localities of Palmachim and Yavne in Israel. It operates under the auspices of the Israel Atomic Energy Commission (IAEC) and under the supervision of the International Atomic Energy Agency (IAEA).

== History ==
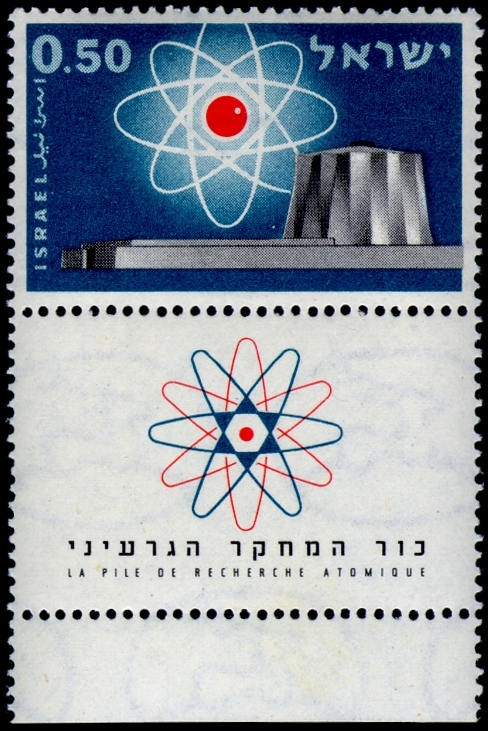
1960 stamp featuring the nuclear research center

The center conducts research in various physical sciences, particularly the development of many kinds of sensors, lasers, atmospheric research, non-destructive testing techniques, space environment, nuclear safety, medical diagnostics and nuclear medicine. Soreq also produces various types of radiopharmaceuticals for use by health care organizations throughout the country.

Some of the institute's research facilities include an AMF 5 MW pool-type light water nuclear reactor supplied in the late 1950s from the United States under the Atoms for Peace program and a 10 MeV proton cyclotron accelerator, as well as extensive laboratory and testing facilities. The center is home to the SARAF – Soreq Applied Research Accelerator Facility which houses a 5-40 MeV, 0.04-5 mA proton and deuteron superconducting linear accelerator.

The center is named after the nearby stream of Soreq.

The center operates under the safeguards of the International Atomic Energy Agency.

== Architecture ==
Noted American modernist architect Philip Johnson designed the center's building in 1956. The project was Johnson's first government commission. Dr. Lev Zetlin, the structural engineer for this project, introduced Philip Johnson to Israeli authorities and facilitated his hiring. Zetlin, one of the most renowned practitioners of his profession, worked very closely with Johnson in the design and construction of the reactor. It was Zetlin who set the parameters and established the conditions for the architect and turned Johnson's ideas into reality.

In an article in Haaretz, Prof. Zvi Efrat, an architect, historian of architecture and former head of the architecture department at the Bezalel Academy of Arts and Design said: "The fact that Johnson of all people, with his Nazi-embracing past, was chosen is no less interesting than the architecture of the building. You can't possibly say that Shimon Peres didn't know. Not only Peres, but all the middlemen who brought him to Peres..." Johnson, who never visited the site, called it "my temple in the desert."
