= Berman Medical Library =

Library in Jerusalem

- הספרייה הרפואית על שם ברמן
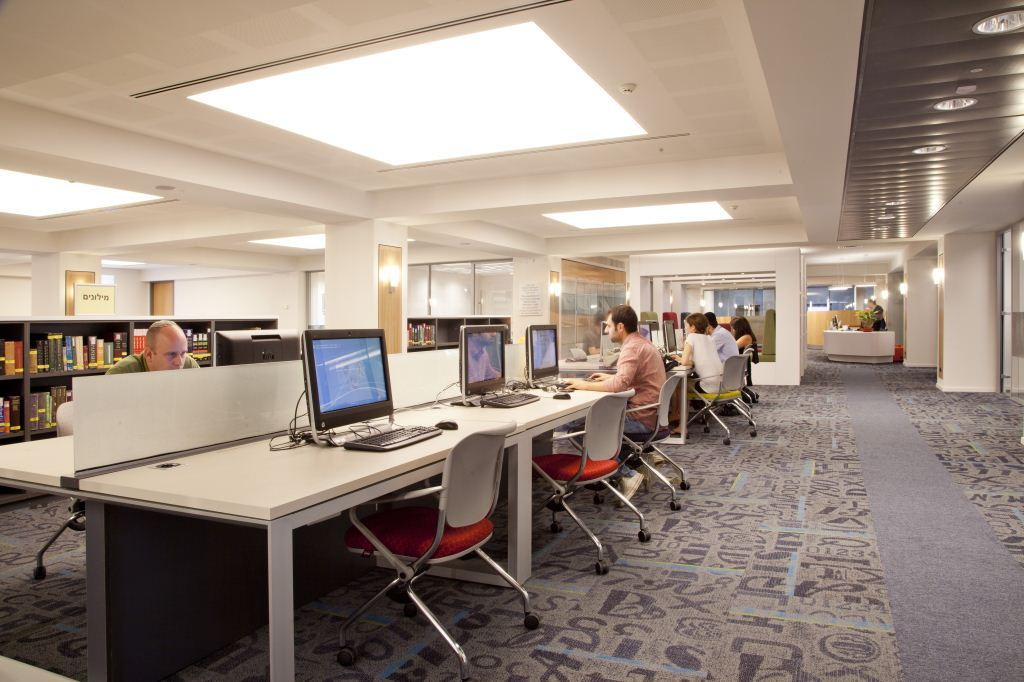
- reading room at the Berman Medical Library
- 31°45′51″N 35°09′01″E
- Location: Jerusalem, Israel
- Type: Academic library
- Established: 1919; 107 years ago

Berman Medical Library is an located in the Ein Kerem Campus of the Hebrew University and Hadassah Medical Center in Jerusalem. The library provides services to the research staff and the students of the Faculties of medicine, pharmacy, nursing, dentistry, public health, occupational therapy, and also to the clinical-academic staff in the Hadassah Medical Center.

== History ==
Berman Medical Library was founded in 1919 with the help of Julius Jarcho, a consulting gynecologist of Beth Israel and Sydenham Hospitals. In 1930 the library was named in his honour, The Dr. Julius Jarcho Medical Library. In the early days the library served as the central medical library in Israel, with branches across the country. In 1966 the Library merged with the Hadassah Medical Center. In 1975 the library moved to its current building, donated by Muriel and Philip Berman of Allentown, Pennsylvania. Since about 2000 the library has also included a medical history museum. Since 2003 the library has been administratively incorporated in the University Library Authority.

Siegfried Plaschkes was the creator of the medical history museum. The Museum was transferred to the Berman Medical Library at the beginning of the millennium. It contains collections of Hebrew amulets, medals, ex-libris, medical stamps, and a number of ancient instruments. The collection of historical works and literature] is the most significant in the country. The collection donated by Süssman Muntner, dealing primarily with Maimonides.

The Division of the History of Medicine is located within Berman Medical Library. Joshua O. Leibowitz (1895-1993) was the first head of the division. Leibowitz was for several years the President of the International Academy of the History of Medicine. His follower, Samuel S. Kottek (emeritus) was the second head, from 1975 till 2000. The Division is now headed by Otniel Dror. The unit provides teaching, ongoing research, and tutoring of MD and PhD theses.
