= Worldly cardinal =

Large cardinal number

In mathematical set theory, a worldly cardinal is a cardinal κ such that the rank V_{κ} is a model of Zermelo–Fraenkel set theory. A strong limit cardinal κ is worldly if and only if for every natural n, there are unboundedly many ordinals θ < κ such that V_{θ} ≺_{Σ_{n}} V_{κ}.

== Relationship to inaccessible cardinals ==
By Zermelo's categoricity theorem, every inaccessible cardinal is worldly. By Shepherdson's theorem, inaccessibility is equivalent to the stronger statement that (V_{κ}, V_{κ+1}) is a model of second order Zermelo-Fraenkel set theory. Being worldly and being inaccessible are not equivalent; in fact, the smallest worldly cardinal has countable cofinality and therefore is a singular cardinal.

The following are in strictly increasing order, where $I$ is the least inaccessible cardinal:

- The least worldly κ.
- The least worldly κ and λ (κ<λ, and same below) with V_{κ} and V_{λ} satisfying the same theory.
- The least worldly κ that is a limit of worldly cardinals (equivalently, a limit of κ worldly cardinals).
- The least worldly κ and λ with V_{κ} ≺_{Σ_{2}} V_{λ} (this is higher than even a κ-fold iteration of the above item).
- The least worldly κ and λ with V_{κ} ≺ V_{λ}.
- The least worldly κ of cofinality ω_{1} (corresponds to the extension of the above item to a chain of length ω_{1}).
- The least worldly κ of cofinality ω_{2} (and so on).
- The least κ>ω with V_{κ} satisfying replacement for the language augmented with the (V_{κ},∈) satisfaction relation.
- The least κ inaccessible in L_{κ}(V_{κ}); equivalently, the least κ>ω with V_{κ} satisfying replacement for formulas in V_{κ} in the infinitary logic L_{∞,ω}.
- The least κ with a transitive model M⊂V_{κ+1} extending V_{κ} satisfying Morse–Kelley set theory.
- (not a worldly cardinal) The least κ with V_{κ} having the same Σ_{2} theory as V_{$I$}.
- The least κ with V_{κ} and V_{$I$} having the same theory.
- The least κ with L_{κ}(V_{κ}) and L_{$I$}(V_{$I$}) having the same theory.
- (not a worldly cardinal) The least κ with V_{κ} and V_{$I$} having the same Σ_{2} theory with real parameters.
- (not a worldly cardinal) The least κ with V_{κ} ≺_{Σ_{2}} V_{$I$}.
- The least κ with V_{κ} ≺ V_{$I$}.
- The least infinite κ with V_{κ} and V_{$I$} satisfying the same L_{∞,ω} statements that are in V_{κ}.
- The least κ with a transitive model M⊂V_{κ+1} extending V_{κ} and satisfying the same sentences with parameters in V_{κ} as V_{$I+1$} does.
- The least inaccessible cardinal $I$.
