= Zermelo's categoricity theorem =

In mathematical set theory, Zermelo's categoricity theorem was proved by Ernst Zermelo in 1930. It states that all models of a certain second-order version of the Zermelo–Fraenkel axioms of set theory are isomorphic to a member of a certain class of sets.

== Statement ==
Let $\mathrm{ZFC}^2$ denote Zermelo–Fraenkel set theory, but with a second-order version of the axiom of replacement formulated as follows:

$$\forall F\forall x\exists y\forall z(z\in y \iff \exists w(w\in x\land z = F(w)))$$

, namely the second-order universal closure of the axiom schema of replacement.^{p. 289} Then every model of $\mathrm{ZFC}^2$ is isomorphic to a set $V_\kappa$ in the von Neumann hierarchy, for some strongly inaccessible cardinal $\kappa$.

== Original presentation ==
Zermelo originally considered a version of $\mathrm{ZFC}^2$ with urelements. Rather than using the modern satisfaction relation $\vDash$, he defines a "normal domain" to be a collection of sets along with the true $\in$ relation that satisfies $\mathrm{ZFC}^2$.^{p. 9}

== Related results ==
Dedekind proved that the second-order Peano axioms hold in a model if and only if the model is isomorphic to the true natural numbers.^{pp. 5–6}^{p. 1} Uzquiano proved that when removing replacement from $\mathsf{ZFC}^2$ and considering a second-order version of Zermelo set theory with a second-order version of separation, there exist models not isomorphic to any $V_\delta$ for a limit ordinal $\delta>\omega$.^{p. 396}
