= Fixed-point lemma for normal functions =

Mathematical result on ordinals

The fixed-point lemma for normal functions is a basic result in axiomatic set theory stating that any normal function has arbitrarily large fixed points (Levy 1979: p. 117). It was first proved by Oswald Veblen in 1908.

== Background and formal statement ==
A normal function is a class function $f$ from the class Ord of ordinal numbers to itself such that:

- $f$ is strictly increasing: $f(\alpha)<f(\beta)$ whenever $\alpha<\beta$.
- $f$ is continuous: for every limit ordinal $\lambda$ (i.e. $\lambda$ is neither zero nor a successor), $f(\lambda)=\sup\{f(\alpha):\alpha<\lambda\}$.

It can be shown that if $f$ is normal then $f$ commutes with suprema; for any nonempty set $A$ of ordinals,

$$f(\sup A)=\sup f(A) = \sup\{f(\alpha):\alpha \in A\}$$.

Indeed, if $\sup A$ is 0 or a successor ordinal then $\sup A$ is an element of $A$ and the equality follows from the increasing property of $f$. If $\sup A$ is a limit ordinal then the equality follows from the continuous property of $f$.

A fixed point of a normal function is an ordinal $\beta$ such that $f(\beta)=\beta$.

The fixed-point lemma states that the class of fixed points of any normal function is nonempty and in fact is unbounded: given any ordinal $\alpha$, there exists an ordinal $\beta$ such that $\beta\geq\alpha$ and $f(\beta)=\beta$.

The continuity of the normal function implies the class of fixed points is closed (the supremum of any subset of the class of fixed points is again a fixed point). Thus the fixed-point lemma is equivalent to the statement that the fixed points of a normal function form a closed and unbounded class.

== Proof ==
The first step of the proof is to verify that $f(\gamma)\ge\gamma$ for all ordinals $\gamma$ and that $f$ commutes with suprema. Given these results, inductively define an increasing sequence $\langle\alpha_n\rangle_{n<\omega}$ by setting $\alpha_0 = \alpha$, and $\alpha_{n+1} = f(\alpha_n)$ for $n\in\omega$. Let $\beta = \sup_{n<\omega} \alpha_n$, so $\beta\ge\alpha$. Moreover, because $f$ commutes with suprema,

$$f(\beta) = f(\sup_{n<\omega} \alpha_n)$$
$$\qquad = \sup_{n<\omega} f(\alpha_n)$$
$$\qquad = \sup_{n<\omega} \alpha_{n+1}$$
$$\qquad = \beta$$

The last equality follows from the fact that the sequence $\langle\alpha_n\rangle_n$ increases. $\square$

As an aside, it can be demonstrated that the $\beta$ found in this way is the smallest fixed point greater than or equal to $\alpha$.

== Example application ==
The function f : Ord → Ord, f(α) = ω_{α} is normal (see initial ordinal). Thus, there exists an ordinal θ such that θ = ω_{θ}. In fact, the lemma shows that there is a closed, unbounded class of such θ.
