= Normal function =

Function of ordinals in mathematics

In axiomatic set theory, a function f : Ord → Ord is called normal (or a normal function) if it is continuous (with respect to the order topology) and strictly monotonically increasing. This is equivalent to the following two conditions:

1. For every limit ordinal γ (i.e. γ is neither zero nor a successor), it is the case that f (γ) = sup{f (ν) : ν < γ}.
2. For all ordinals α < β, it is the case that f (α) < f (β).

== Examples ==
A simple normal function is given by f (α) = 1 + α (see ordinal arithmetic). But f (α) = α + 1 is not normal because it is not continuous at any limit ordinal (for example, $f(\omega) = \omega+1 \ne \omega = \sup \{f(n) : n < \omega\}$). If β is a fixed ordinal, then the functions f (α) = β + α, f (α) = β × α (for β ≥ 1), and f (α) = β^{α} (for β ≥ 2) are all normal.

More important examples of normal functions are given by the aleph numbers $f(\alpha) = \aleph_\alpha$, which connect ordinal and cardinal numbers, and by the beth numbers $f(\alpha) = \beth_\alpha$.

== Properties ==
If f is normal, then for any ordinal α,

f (α) ≥ α.

Proof: If not, choose γ minimal such that f (γ) < γ. Since f is strictly monotonically increasing, f (f (γ)) < f (γ), contradicting minimality of γ.

Furthermore, for any non-empty set S of ordinals, we have

f (sup S) = sup f (S).

Proof: "≥" follows from the monotonicity of f and the definition of the supremum. For "≤", consider three cases:

- if sup S = 0, then S = {0} and sup f (S) = f (0) = f (sup S);
- if sup S = ν + 1 is a successor, then sup S is in S, so f (sup S) is in f (S), i.e. f (sup S) ≤ sup f (S);
- if sup S is a nonzero limit, then for any ν < sup S there exists an s in S such that ν < s, i.e. f (ν) < f (s) ≤ sup f (S), yielding f (sup S) = sup {f (ν) : ν < sup S} ≤ sup f (S).

Every normal function f has arbitrarily large fixed points; see the fixed-point lemma for normal functions for a proof. One can create a normal function f ′ : Ord → Ord, called the derivative of f, such that f ′(α) is the α-th fixed point of f. For a hierarchy of normal functions, see Veblen functions.
