= Supertransitive class =

Transitive class including powersets of elements

In set theory, a supertransitive class is a transitive class which includes as a subset the power set of each of its elements.

Formally, let A be a transitive class. Then A is supertransitive if and only if

$(\forall x)(x\in A \to \mathcal{P}(x) \subseteq A).$

Here P(x) denotes the power set of x.

== See also ==
- Rank (set theory)
