= End extension =

Extension of a transitive set

In model theory and set theory, a model $\mathfrak{B}=\langle B, F\rangle$ of some axiom system of set theory $T$ in the language of set theory is an end extension of $\mathfrak{A}=\langle A, E\rangle$, in symbols $\mathfrak{A}\subseteq_\text{end}\mathfrak{B}$, if

1. $\mathfrak{A}$ is a substructure of $\mathfrak{B}$, (i.e., $A \subseteq B$ and $E = F|_A$), and
2. $b\in A$ whenever $a\in A$ and $bFa$ hold, i.e., no new elements are added by $\mathfrak{B}$ to the elements of $A$.

The second condition can be equivalently written as $\{b\in A : b E a\}=\{b\in B : b F a\}$ for all $a\in A$.

For example, $\langle B, \in\rangle$ is an end extension of $\langle A, \in\rangle$ if $A$ and $B$ are transitive sets, and $A\subseteq B$.

A related concept is that of a top extension (also known as rank extension), where a model $\mathfrak{B}=\langle B, F\rangle$ is a top extension of a model $\mathfrak{A}=\langle A, E\rangle$ if $\mathfrak{A}\subseteq_\text{end}\mathfrak{B}$ and for all $a \in A$ and $b \in B\setminus A$, we have $\operatorname{rank}(b) > \operatorname{rank}(a)$, where $\operatorname{rank}(\cdot)$ denotes the rank of a set.

== Existence ==
Keisler and Morley showed that every countable model of ZF has an end extension which is also an elementary extension. If the elementarity requirement is weakened to being elementary for formulae that are $\Sigma_n$ on the Lévy hierarchy, every countable structure in which $\Sigma_n$-collection holds has a $\Sigma_n$-elementary end extension.
