= Substructure (mathematics) =

Structure in mathematical logic

In mathematical logic, an (induced) substructure or (induced) subalgebra is a structure whose domain is a subset of that of a bigger structure, and whose functions and relations are restricted to the substructure's domain. Some examples of subalgebras are subgroups, submonoids, subrings, subfields, subalgebras of algebras over a field, or induced subgraphs. Shifting the point of view, the larger structure is called an extension or a superstructure of its substructure.

In model theory, the term "submodel" is often used as a synonym for substructure, especially when the context suggests a theory of which both structures are models.

In the presence of relations (i.e. for structures such as ordered groups or graphs, whose signature is not functional) it may make sense to relax the conditions on a subalgebra so that the relations on a weak substructure (or weak subalgebra) are at most those induced from the bigger structure. Subgraphs are an example where the distinction matters, and the term "subgraph" does indeed refer to weak substructures. Ordered groups, on the other hand, have the special property that every substructure of an ordered group which is itself an ordered group, is an induced substructure.

== Definition ==
Given two structures A and B of the same signature σ, A is said to be a weak substructure of B, or a weak subalgebra of B, if

- the domain of A is a subset of the domain of B,
- f ^{A} = f ^{B}|_{A^{n}} for every n-ary function symbol f in σ, and
- R ^{A} $\subseteq$ R ^{B} $\cap$ A^{n} for every n-ary relation symbol R in σ.

A is said to be a substructure of B, or a subalgebra of B, if A is a weak subalgebra of B and, moreover,

- R ^{A} = R ^{B} $\cap$ A^{n} for every n-ary relation symbol R in σ.

If A is a substructure of B, then B is called a superstructure of A or, especially if A is an induced substructure, an extension of A.

== Examples ==
Some substructure relations of common associative algebras. The upper lattice shows subalgebras and is in Galois correspondence with the lattice of groups generated by basis elements.

In the language consisting of the binary operations + and ×, binary relation <, and constants 0 and 1, the structure (Q, +, ×, <, 0, 1) is a substructure of (R, +, ×, <, 0, 1). More generally, the substructures of an ordered field (or just a field) are precisely its subfields. Similarly, in the language (×, ^{−1}, 1) of groups, the substructures of a group are its subgroups. In the language (×, 1) of monoids, however, the substructures of a group are its submonoids. They need not be groups; and even if they are groups, they need not be subgroups.

Subrings are the substructures of rings, and subalgebras are the substructures of algebras over a field.

In the case of graphs (in the signature consisting of one binary relation), subgraphs, and its weak substructures are precisely its subgraphs.

== As subobjects ==
For every signature σ, induced substructures of σ-structures are the subobjects in the concrete category of σ-structures and strong homomorphisms (and also in the concrete category of σ-structures and σ-embeddings). Weak substructures of σ-structures are the subobjects in the concrete category of σ-structures and homomorphisms in the ordinary sense.

== Submodel ==
In model theory, given a structure M which is a model of a theory T, a submodel of M in a narrower sense is a substructure of M which is also a model of T. For example, if T is the theory of abelian groups in the signature (+, 0), then the submodels of the group of integers (Z, +, 0) are the substructures which are also abelian groups. Thus the natural numbers (N, +, 0) form a substructure of (Z, +, 0) which is not a submodel, while the even numbers (2Z, +, 0) form a submodel.

Other examples:

1. The algebraic numbers form a submodel of the complex numbers in the theory of algebraically closed fields.
2. The rational numbers form a submodel of the real numbers in the theory of fields.
3. Every elementary substructure of a model of a theory T also satisfies T; hence it is a submodel.

In the category of models of a theory and embeddings between them, the submodels of a model are its subobjects.

== See also ==
- Conservative extension (model theory)
- Elementary substructure
- End extension
- Löwenheim–Skolem theorem
- Prime model
