= Conglomerate (mathematics) =

In mathematics, collection of classes

In mathematics, in the framework of a one-universe foundation for category theory, the term conglomerate is applied to arbitrary sets as a contraposition to the distinguished sets that are elements of a Grothendieck universe.

== Definition ==
The most popular axiomatic set theories, Zermelo–Fraenkel set theory (ZFC), von Neumann–Bernays–Gödel set theory (NBG), and Morse–Kelley set theory (MK), admit non-conservative extensions that arise after adding a supplementary axiom of existence of a Grothendieck universe $U$. An example of such an extension is the Tarski–Grothendieck set theory, where an infinite hierarchy of Grothendieck universes is postulated.

The concept of conglomerate was created to deal with "collections" of classes, which is desirable in category theory so that each class can be considered as an element of a "more general collection", a conglomerate. Technically this is organized by changes in terminology: when a Grothendieck universe $U$ is added to the chosen axiomatic set theory (ZFC/NBG/MK) it is considered convenient

- to apply the term "set" only to elements of $U$,
- to apply the term "class" only to subsets of $U$,
- to apply the term "conglomerate" to all sets (not necessary elements or subsets of $U$).

As a result, in this terminology, each set is a class, and each class is a conglomerate.

== Corollaries ==
Formally this construction describes a model of the initial axiomatic set theory (ZFC/NBG/MK) in the extension of this theory ("ZFC/NBG/MK+Grothendieck universe") with $U$ as the universe.

If the initial axiomatic set theory admits the idea of a proper class (i.e. an object that can't be an element of any other object, like the class $Set$ of all sets in NBG and in MK), then these objects (proper classes) are discarded from the consideration in the new theory ("NBG/MK+Grothendieck universe"). However, (not counting the possible problems caused by the supplementary axiom of existence of $U$) this in some sense does not lead to a loss of information about objects of the old theory (NBG or MK) since its representation as a model in the new theory ("NBG/MK+Grothendieck universe") means that what can be proved in NBG/MK about its usual objects called classes (including proper classes) can be proved as well in "NBG/MK+Grothendieck universe" about its classes (i.e. about subsets of $U$, including subsets that are not elements of $U$, which are analogs of proper classes from NBG/MK). At the same time, the new theory is not equivalent to the initial one, since some extra propositions about classes can be proved in "NBG/MK+Grothendieck universe" but not in NBG/MK.

== Terminology ==
The change in terminology is sometimes called "conglomerate convention". The first step, made by Mac Lane, is to apply the term "class" only to subsets of $U.$ Mac Lane does not redefine existing set-theoretic terms; rather, he works in a set theory without classes (ZFC, not NBG/MK), calls members of $U$ "small sets", and states that the small sets and the classes satisfy the axioms of NBG. He does not need "conglomerates", since sets need not be small.

The term "conglomerate" lurks in reviews of the 1970s and 1980s on Mathematical Reviews without definition, explanation or reference, and sometimes in papers.

While the conglomerate convention is in force, it must be used exclusively in order to avoid ambiguity; that is, conglomerates should not be called “sets” in the usual fashion of ZFC.
