= Successor ordinal =

Operation on ordinal numbers

In set theory, the successor of an ordinal number α is the smallest ordinal number greater than α. An ordinal number that is a successor is called a successor ordinal. The ordinals 1, 2, and 3 are the first three successor ordinals and the ordinals ω+1, ω+2 and ω+3 are the first three infinite successor ordinals.

== Properties ==
Every ordinal other than 0 is either a successor ordinal or a limit ordinal.

== In Von Neumann's model ==
Using von Neumann's ordinal numbers (the standard model of the ordinals used in set theory), the successor S(α) of an ordinal number α is given by the formula

$$S(\alpha) = \alpha \cup \{\alpha\}.$$

Since the ordering on the ordinal numbers is given by α < β if and only if α ∈ β, it is immediate that there is no ordinal number between α and S(α), and it is also clear that α < S(α).

== Ordinal addition ==
The successor operation can be used to define ordinal addition rigorously via transfinite recursion as follows:

$$\alpha + 0 = \alpha\!$$
$$\alpha + S(\beta) = S(\alpha + \beta)$$

and for a limit ordinal λ

$$\alpha + \lambda = \bigcup_{\beta < \lambda} (\alpha + \beta)$$

In particular, α + 1 = α + S(0) = S(α + 0) = S(α). Multiplication and exponentiation are defined similarly.

== Topology ==
The successor points and zero are the isolated points of the class of ordinal numbers, with respect to the order topology.

== See also ==
- Ordinal arithmetic
- Limit ordinal
- Successor cardinal
