= Von Neumann universe =

Set theory concept

In set theory and related branches of mathematics, the von Neumann universe, or von Neumann hierarchy of sets, denoted by V, is the class of hereditary well-founded sets. This collection, which is formalized by Zermelo–Fraenkel set theory (ZFC), is often used to provide an interpretation or motivation of the axioms of ZFC. The concept is named after John von Neumann, although it was first published by Ernst Zermelo in 1930.

The rank of a well-founded set is defined inductively as the smallest ordinal number greater than the ranks of all members of the set. In particular, the rank of the empty set is zero, and every ordinal has a rank equal to itself. The sets in V are divided into the transfinite hierarchy V_{α} , called the cumulative hierarchy, based on their rank.

== Definition ==
An initial segment of the von Neumann universe. Ordinal multiplication is reversed from our usual convention; see Ordinal arithmetic.

The cumulative hierarchy is a collection of sets V_{α} indexed by the class of ordinal numbers; in particular, V_{α} is the set of all sets having ranks less than α. Thus there is one set V_{α} for each ordinal number α. V_{α} may be defined by transfinite recursion as follows:

- Let V_{0} be the empty set:
  $$V_0 := \varnothing .$$
- For any ordinal number β, let V_{β+1} be the power set of V_{β}:
  $$V_{\beta+1} := \mathcal{P} (V_\beta) .$$
- For any limit ordinal λ, let V_{λ} be the union of all the V-stages so far:
  $$V_\lambda := \bigcup_{\beta < \lambda} V_\beta .$$

A crucial fact about this definition is that there is a single formula φ(α,x) in the language of ZFC that states "(α is an ordinal and) the set x is in V_{α}".

The sets V_{α} are called stages or ranks.

The class V is defined to be the union of all the V-stages:

$$V := \bigcup_{\alpha} V_\alpha.$$

=== Rank of a set ===
The rank of a set S is the smallest α such that $S \subseteq V_\alpha \,.$ In other words, $\mathcal{P} (V_\alpha)$ is the set of sets with rank ≤α. The stage V_{α} can also be characterized as the set of sets with rank strictly less than α, regardless of whether α is 0, a successor ordinal, or a limit ordinal:

$$V_\alpha := \bigcup_{\beta < \alpha} \mathcal{P} (V_\beta).$$

This gives an equivalent definition of V_{α} by transfinite recursion.

Substituting the above definition of V_{α} back into the definition of the rank of a set gives a self-contained recursive definition:

The rank of a set is the smallest ordinal number strictly greater than the rank of all of its members.

In other words,

$$\operatorname{rank} (S) = \bigcup \{ \operatorname{rank} (z) + 1 \mid z \in S \}.$$

=== Finite and low cardinality stages of the hierarchy ===
The first five von Neumann stages V_{0} to V_{4} may be visualized as follows. (An empty box represents the empty set. A box containing only an empty box represents the set containing only the empty set, and so forth.)

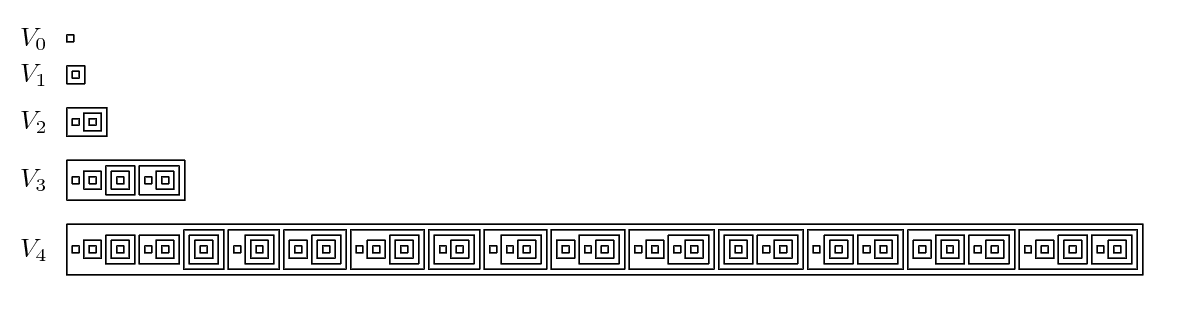
First 5 von Neumann stages

This sequence exhibits tetrational growth. The set V_{5} contains 2^{16} = 65536 elements; the set V_{6} contains 2^{65536} elements, which very substantially exceeds the number of atoms in the observable universe; and for any natural $n$, the set V_{n+1} contains $2\uparrow\uparrow n$ elements using Knuth's up-arrow notation. So the finite stages of the cumulative hierarchy cannot physically be written down explicitly after stage 5. The set V_{ω} has the same cardinality as ω. The set V_{ω+1} has the same cardinality as the set of real numbers.

== Applications and interpretations ==
=== Interpretation as the set-theoretical universe ===
In the standard Zermelo–Fraenkel set theory, V is simply the universe, i.e., the class of all sets. It is a proper class, and thus not "the set of all sets", even though each individual stage V_{α} is a set, because the index α ranges over the class of all ordinals, a proper class. The universality of V also depends on the axiom of foundation (also known as the axiom of regularity). In non-well-founded set theories, the universe is larger than V since the former also contains non-well-founded sets.

Often, V is defined as the universe, and then the formula V = ⋃_{α}V_{α} means "the universe of ZF sets is equal to the cumulative hierarchy"—not a definition, but a theorem equivalent to the axiom of regularity. Roitman states (without references) that the realization of this equivalence is due to von Neumann.

By the modern definition, V also does not include urelements in the first stage, and thus only contains "pure sets". However, Zermelo's original construction of his transfinite recursive hierarchy in 1930 includes all urelements in V_{1} (P_{1} in his notation), with the empty set considered a special case of an urelement.

=== Applications of V as models for set theories ===
If $\omega$ is the set of natural numbers, then $V_\omega$ is the set of hereditarily finite sets, which is a model of set theory without the axiom of infinity.

$V_{\omega+\omega}$ is the universe of "ordinary mathematics", and is a model of Zermelo set theory (but not a model of ZF). A simple argument in favour of the adequacy of $V_{\omega+\omega}$ is the observation that $V_{\omega+1}$ is adequate for the integers, while $V_{\omega+2}$ is adequate for the real numbers, and most other normal mathematics can be built as relations of various kinds from these sets without needing the axiom of replacement to go outside $V_{\omega+\omega}$.

If $\kappa$ is an inaccessible cardinal, then $V_\kappa$ is a model of Zermelo–Fraenkel set theory (ZFC) itself, and V_{κ+1} is a model of Morse–Kelley set theory. (Note that every ZFC model is also a ZF model, and every ZF model is also a Z model.)

=== Hilbert's paradox ===
The von Neumann universe satisfies the following two properties:

- $\mathcal{P}(x) \in V$ for every set $x \in V$.
- $\bigcup x \in V$ for every subset $x \subseteq V$.

Indeed, if $x \in V$, then $x \in V_\alpha$ for some ordinal $\alpha$. Any stage is a transitive set, hence every $y \in x$ is already $y \in V_\alpha$, and so every subset of $x$ is a subset of $V_\alpha$. Therefore, $\mathcal{P}(x) \subseteq V_{\alpha+1}$ and $\mathcal{P}(x) \in V_{\alpha+2} \subseteq V$. For unions of subsets, if $x \subseteq V$, then for every $y \in x$, let $\beta_y$ be the smallest ordinal for which $y \in V_{\beta_y}$. Because by assumption $x$ is a set, we can form the limit $\alpha = \sup \{ \beta_y : y \in x \}$. The stages are cumulative, and therefore again every $y \in x$ is $y \in V_\alpha$. Then every $z \in y$ is also $z \in V_\alpha$, and so $\cup x \subseteq V_\alpha$ and $\cup x \in V_{\alpha+1}$.

Hilbert's paradox implies that no set with the above properties exists . For suppose $V$ was a set. Then $V$ would be a subset of itself, and $U = \cup V$ would belong to $V$, and so would $\mathcal{P}(U)$. But more generally, if $A \in B$, then $A \subseteq \cup B$. Hence, $\mathcal{P}(U) \subseteq \cup V = U$, which is impossible in models of ZFC such as $V$ itself.

Interestingly, $x$ is a subset of $V$ if, and only if, $x$ is a member of $V$. Therefore, we can consider what happens if the union condition is replaced with $x \in V \implies \cup x \in V$. In this case, there are no known contradictions, and any Grothendieck universe satisfies the new pair of properties. However, whether Grothendieck universes exist is a question beyond ZFC.

=== The existential status of V ===
Since the class V may be considered to be the arena for most of mathematics, it is important to establish that it "exists" in some sense. Since existence is a difficult concept, one typically replaces the existence question with the consistency question, that is, whether the concept is free of contradictions. A major obstacle is posed by Gödel's incompleteness theorems, which effectively imply the impossibility of proving the consistency of ZF set theory in ZF set theory itself, provided that it is in fact consistent.

The integrity of the von Neumann universe depends fundamentally on the integrity of the ordinal numbers, which act as the rank parameter in the construction, and the integrity of transfinite induction, by which both the ordinal numbers and the von Neumann universe are constructed. The integrity of the ordinal number construction may be said to rest upon von Neumann's 1923 and 1928 papers. The integrity of the construction of V by transfinite induction may be said to have then been established in Zermelo's 1930 paper.

== History ==
The cumulative type hierarchy, also known as the von Neumann universe, is claimed by Gregory H. Moore (1982) to be inaccurately attributed to von Neumann. The first publication of the von Neumann universe was by Ernst Zermelo in 1930.

Existence and uniqueness of the general transfinite recursive definition of sets was demonstrated in 1928 by von Neumann for both Zermelo–Fraenkel set theory and von Neumann's own set theory (which later developed into NBG set theory). In neither of these papers did he apply his transfinite recursive method to construct the universe of all sets. The presentations of the von Neumann universe by Bernays and Mendelson both give credit to von Neumann for the transfinite induction construction method, although not for its application to the construction of the universe of ordinary sets.

The notation V is not a tribute to the name of von Neumann. It was used for the universe of sets in 1889 by Peano, the letter V signifying "Verum", which he used both as a logical symbol and to denote the class of all individuals. Peano's notation V was adopted also by Whitehead and Russell for the class of all sets in 1910. The V notation (for the class of all sets) was not used by von Neumann in his 1920s papers about ordinal numbers and transfinite induction. Paul Cohen explicitly attributes his use of the letter V (for the class of all sets) to a 1940 paper by Gödel, although Gödel most likely obtained the notation from earlier sources such as Whitehead and Russell.

== See also ==
- Constructible universe
- Grothendieck universe
- Inaccessible cardinal
- S (set theory)
- Universe (mathematics)
