= Inaccessible cardinal =

Type of infinite number in set theory

In set theory, a cardinal number is a strongly inaccessible cardinal if it is uncountable, regular, and a strong limit cardinal. A cardinal is a weakly inaccessible cardinal if it is uncountable, regular, and a weak limit cardinal.

Since about 1950, "inaccessible cardinal" has typically meant "strongly inaccessible cardinal" whereas before it had meant "weakly inaccessible cardinal". Weakly inaccessible cardinals were introduced by Hausdorff (1908). Strongly inaccessible cardinals were introduced by Sierpiński & Tarski (1930) and Zermelo (1930); in the latter they were referred to along with $\aleph_0$ as Grenzzahlen (English "limit numbers").

Every strongly inaccessible cardinal is a weakly inaccessible cardinal. The generalized continuum hypothesis implies that all weakly inaccessible cardinals are strongly inaccessible as well.

The two notions of an inaccessible cardinal $\kappa$ describe a cardinality $\kappa$ which can not be obtained as the cardinality of a result of typical set-theoretic operations involving only sets of cardinality less than $\kappa$. Hence the word "inaccessible". By mandating that inaccessible cardinals are uncountable, they turn out to be very large.

In particular, inaccessible cardinals need not exist at all. That is, it is believed that there are models of Zermelo-Fraenkel set theory, even with the axiom of choice (ZFC), for which no inaccessible cardinals exist. On the other hand, it is also believed that there are models of ZFC for which even strongly inaccessible cardinals do exist. That ZFC can accommodate these large sets, but does not necessitate them, provides an introduction to the large cardinal axioms. See also Models and consistency.

The existence of a strongly inaccessible cardinal is equivalent to the existence of a Grothendieck universe. If $\kappa$ is a strongly inaccessible cardinal then the von Neumann stage $V_{\kappa}$ is a Grothendieck universe. Conversely, if $U$ is a Grothendieck universe then there is a strongly inaccessible cardinal $\kappa$ such that $V_{\kappa}=U$. As expected from their correspondence with strongly inaccessible cardinals, Grothendieck universes are very well-closed under set-theoretic operations.

An ordinal is a weakly inaccessible cardinal if and only if it is a regular ordinal and it is a limit of regular ordinals. (Zero, one, and $\omega$ are regular ordinals, but not limits of regular ordinals.)

From some perspectives, the requirement that a weakly or strongly inaccessible cardinal be uncountable is unnatural or unnecessary. Even though $\aleph_0$ is countable, it is regular and is a strong limit cardinal. $\aleph_0$ is also the smallest weak limit regular cardinal. Assuming the axiom of choice, every other infinite cardinal number is either regular or a weak limit cardinal. However, only a rather large cardinal number can be both. Since a cardinal $\kappa$ larger than $\aleph_0$ is necessarily uncountable, if $\kappa$ is also regular and a weak limit cardinal then $\kappa$ must be a weakly inaccessible cardinal.

== Models and consistency ==
Suppose that $\kappa$ is a cardinal number. Zermelo–Fraenkel set theory with Choice (ZFC) implies that the $\kappa$th level of the Von Neumann universe $V_\kappa$ is a model of ZFC whenever $\kappa$ is strongly inaccessible. Furthermore, ZF implies that the Gödel universe $L_\kappa$ is a model of ZFC whenever $\kappa$ is weakly inaccessible. Thus, ZF together with "there exists a weakly inaccessible cardinal" implies that ZFC is consistent. Therefore, inaccessible cardinals are a type of large cardinal.

If $V$ is a standard model of ZFC and $\kappa$ is an inaccessible in $V$, then

1. $V_\kappa$ is one of the intended models of Zermelo–Fraenkel set theory;
2. $Def(V_\kappa)$ is one of the intended models of Mendelson's version of Von Neumann–Bernays–Gödel set theory which excludes global choice, replacing limitation of size by replacement and ordinary choice;
3. and $V_{\kappa+1}$ is one of the intended models of Morse–Kelley set theory.

Here, $Def(X)$ is the set of $\Delta_0$-definable subsets of $X$ (see constructible universe). It is worth pointing out that the first claim can be weakened: $\kappa$ does not need to be inaccessible, or even a cardinal number, in order for $V_\kappa$ to be a standard model of ZF (see below).

Suppose $V$ is a model of ZFC. Either $V$ contains no strong inaccessible or, taking $\kappa$ to be the smallest strong inaccessible in $V$, $V_\kappa$ is a standard model of ZFC which contains no strong inaccessibles. Thus, the consistency of ZFC implies consistency of ZFC+"there are no strong inaccessibles". Similarly, either $V$ contains no weak inaccessible or, taking $\kappa$ to be the smallest ordinal which is weakly inaccessible relative to any standard sub-model of $V$, then $L_\kappa$ is a standard model of ZFC which contains no weak inaccessibles. So consistency of ZFC implies consistency of ZFC+"there are no weak inaccessibles". This shows that ZFC cannot prove the existence of an inaccessible cardinal, so ZFC is consistent with the non-existence of any inaccessible cardinals.

The issue whether ZFC is consistent with the existence of an inaccessible cardinal is more subtle. The proof sketched in the previous paragraph that the consistency of ZFC implies the consistency of ZFC + "there is not an inaccessible cardinal" can be formalized in ZFC. However, assuming that ZFC is consistent, no proof that the consistency of ZFC implies the consistency of ZFC + "there is an inaccessible cardinal" can be formalized in ZFC. This follows from Gödel's second incompleteness theorem, which shows that if ZFC + "there is an inaccessible cardinal" is consistent, then it cannot prove its own consistency. Because ZFC + "there is an inaccessible cardinal" does prove the consistency of ZFC, if ZFC proved that its own consistency implies the consistency of ZFC + "there is an inaccessible cardinal", then this latter theory would be able to prove its own consistency, which is impossible if it is consistent.

There are arguments for the existence of inaccessible cardinals that cannot be formalized in ZFC. One such argument, presented by Hrbáček & Jech (1999, p. 279), is that the class of all ordinals of a particular model $M$ of set theory would itself be an inaccessible cardinal if there was a larger model of set theory extending $M$ and preserving powerset of elements of $M$.

== Existence of a proper class of inaccessibles ==
There are many important axiomsin set theory which assert the existence of a proper class of cardinals which satisfy a predicate of interest. In the case of inaccessibility, the corresponding axiom is the assertion that for every cardinal $\mu$, there is an inaccessible cardinal $\kappa$ which is strictly larger, $\mu < \kappa$. Thus, this axiom guarantees the existence of an infinite tower of inaccessible cardinals (and may occasionally be referred to as the inaccessible cardinal axiom). As is the case for the existence of any inaccessible cardinal, the inaccessible cardinal axiom is unprovable from the axioms of ZFC. Assuming ZFC, the inaccessible cardinal axiom is equivalent to the universe axiom of Grothendieck and Verdier: every set is contained in a Grothendieck universe. The axioms of ZFC along with the universe axiom (or equivalently the inaccessible cardinal axiom) are denoted ZFCU (not to be confused with ZFC with urelements). This axiomatic system is useful to prove for example that every category has an appropriate Yoneda embedding.

This is a relatively weak large cardinal axiom since it amounts to saying that $\infty$ is 1-inaccessible in the language of the next section, where $\infty$ denotes the least ordinal not in $V$, i.e. the class of all ordinals in your model.

== α-inaccessible cardinals and hyper-inaccessible cardinals ==
The term "$\alpha$-inaccessible cardinal" is ambiguous and different authors use inequivalent definitions. One definition is that a cardinal $\kappa$ is called $\boldsymbol{\alpha}$-inaccessible, for any ordinal $\alpha$, if $\kappa$ is inaccessible and for every ordinal $\beta < \alpha$, the set of $\beta$-inaccessibles less than $\kappa$ is unbounded in $\kappa$ (and thus of cardinality $\kappa$, since $\kappa$ is regular). In this case the 0-inaccessible cardinals are the same as strongly inaccessible cardinals. Another possible definition is that a cardinal $\kappa$ is called $\boldsymbol{\alpha}$-weakly inaccessible if $\kappa$ is regular and for every ordinal $\beta < \alpha$, the set of $\beta$-weakly inaccessibles less than $\kappa$ is unbounded in $\kappa$. In this case the 0-weakly inaccessible cardinals are the regular cardinals and the 1-weakly inaccessible cardinals are the weakly inaccessible cardinals.

The $\alpha$-inaccessible cardinals can also be described as fixed points of functions which count the lower inaccessibles. For example, denote by $\psi_0(\lambda)$ the $\lambda$^{th} inaccessible cardinal, then the fixed points of $\psi_0$ are the 1-inaccessible cardinals. Then letting $\psi_\beta(\lambda)$ be the $\lambda$^{th} $\beta$-inaccessible cardinal, the fixed points of $\psi_\beta$ are the $(\beta + 1)$-inaccessible cardinals (the values $\psi_{\beta + 1}(\lambda)$. If $\alpha$ is a limit ordinal, an $\alpha$-inaccessible is a fixed point of every $\psi_\beta$ for $\beta < \alpha$ (the value $\psi_\alpha(\lambda)$ is the $\lambda$^{th} such cardinal). This process of taking fixed points of functions generating successively larger cardinals is commonly encountered in the study of large cardinal numbers.

The term hyper-inaccessible is ambiguous and has at least three incompatible meanings. Many authors use it to mean a regular limit of strongly inaccessible cardinals (1-inaccessible). Other authors use it to mean that $\kappa$ is $\kappa$-inaccessible. (It can never be $\kappa + 1$-inaccessible.) It is occasionally used to mean Mahlo cardinal.

The term $\boldsymbol{\alpha}$-hyper-inaccessible is also ambiguous. Some authors use it to mean $\alpha$-inaccessible. Other authors use the definition that for any ordinal $\alpha$, a cardinal $\kappa$ is $\boldsymbol{\alpha}$-hyper-inaccessible if and only if $\kappa$ is hyper-inaccessible and for every ordinal $\beta < \alpha$, the set of $\beta$-hyper-inaccessibles less than $\kappa$ is unbounded in $\kappa$.

Hyper-hyper-inaccessible cardinals and so on can be defined in similar ways, and as usual this term is ambiguous.

Using "weakly inaccessible" instead of "inaccessible", similar definitions can be made for "weakly $\alpha$-inaccessible", "weakly hyper-inaccessible", and "weakly $\alpha$-hyper-inaccessible".

Mahlo cardinals are inaccessible, hyper-inaccessible, hyper-hyper-inaccessible, ... and so on.

== Two model-theoretic characterisations of inaccessibility ==
Firstly, a cardinal $\kappa$ is inaccessible if and only if $\kappa$ has the following reflection property: for all subsets $U\subset V_\kappa$, there exists $\alpha<\kappa$ such that $(V_\alpha,\in,U\cap V_\alpha)$ is an elementary substructure of $(V_\kappa,\in,U)$. (In fact, the set of such $\alpha$ is closed unbounded in $\kappa$.) Therefore, $\kappa$ is $\Pi_n^0$-indescribable for all $n \geq 0$. On the other hand, there is not necessarily an ordinal $\alpha>\kappa$ such that $V_\kappa$, and if this holds, then $\kappa$ must be the $\kappa$th inaccessible cardinal.

It is provable in ZF that $V$ has a somewhat weaker reflection property, where the substructure $(V_\alpha,\in,U\cap V_\alpha)$ is only required to be 'elementary' with respect to a finite set of formulas. Ultimately, the reason for this weakening is that whereas the model-theoretic satisfaction relation $\vDash$ can be defined, semantic truth itself (i.e. $\vDash_V$) cannot, due to Tarski's theorem.

Secondly, under ZFC Zermelo's categoricity theorem can be shown, which states that $\kappa$ is inaccessible if and only if $(V_\kappa,\in)$ is a model of second order ZFC.

In this case, by the reflection property above, there exists $\alpha<\kappa$ such that $(V_\alpha,\in)$ is a standard model of (first order) ZFC. Hence, the existence of an inaccessible cardinal is a stronger hypothesis than the existence of a transitive model of ZFC.

Inaccessibility of $\kappa$ is a $\Pi^1_1$ property over $V_\kappa$, while a cardinal $\pi$ being inaccessible (in some given model of $\mathrm{ZF}$ containing $\pi$) is $\Pi_1$.

== Without the axiom of choice ==
In ZF without the axiom of choice, we can define what it means to be strongly inaccessible. An ordinal κ is strongly inaccessible iff ω < κ and for all α < κ, for every function from V_{α} to κ, there is β < κ such that the image of the function is a subset of β.

Similarly, an ordinal κ is weakly inaccessible iff ω < κ and for all α < κ, for every function from α^{+} to κ, there is β < κ such that the image of the function is a subset of β. Here α^{+} is the successor cardinal (i.e. Hartogs number) of α.

== See also ==
- Worldly cardinal, a weaker notion
- Mahlo cardinal, a stronger notion
- Club set
- Inner model
- Von Neumann universe
- Constructible universe

== Works cited ==
- Drake, F. R. (1974), Set Theory: An Introduction to Large Cardinals, Studies in Logic and the Foundations of Mathematics, vol. 76, Elsevier Science, ISBN 0-444-10535-2
- Hausdorff, Felix (1908), "Grundzüge einer Theorie der geordneten Mengen", Mathematische Annalen, 65 (4): 435–505, doi:10.1007/BF01451165, hdl:10338.dmlcz/100813, ISSN 0025-5831, S2CID 119648544
- Hrbáček, Karel; Jech, Thomas (1999), Introduction to set theory (3rd ed.), New York: Dekker, ISBN 978-0-8247-7915-3
- Kanamori, Akihiro (2003), The Higher Infinite: Large Cardinals in Set Theory from Their Beginnings (2nd ed.), Springer, ISBN 3-540-00384-3
- Sierpiński, Wacław; Tarski, Alfred (1930), "Sur une propriété caractéristique des nombres inaccessibles" (PDF), Fundamenta Mathematicae, 15: 292–300, doi:10.4064/fm-15-1-292-300, ISSN 0016-2736
- Zermelo, Ernst (1930), "Über Grenzzahlen und Mengenbereiche: neue Untersuchungen über die Grundlagen der Mengenlehre" (PDF), Fundamenta Mathematicae, 16: 29–47, doi:10.4064/fm-16-1-29-47, ISSN 0016-2736. English translation: Ewald, William B. (1996), "On boundary numbers and domains of sets: new investigations in the foundations of set theory", From Immanuel Kant to David Hilbert: A Source Book in the Foundations of Mathematics, Oxford University Press, pp. 1208–1233, ISBN 978-0-19-853271-2.
