= Limit cardinal =

Class of cardinal numbers

In mathematics, limit cardinals are certain cardinal numbers. A cardinal number λ is a weak limit cardinal if λ is neither a successor cardinal nor zero. This means that one cannot "reach" λ from another cardinal by repeated cardinal successor operations. These cardinals are sometimes called simply "limit cardinals" when the context is clear.

A cardinal λ is a strong limit cardinal if λ cannot be reached by repeated powerset operations. This means that λ is nonzero and, for all κ < λ, 2^{κ} < λ. Every strong limit cardinal is also a weak limit cardinal, because by Cantor's theorem κ^{+} ≤ 2^{κ} for every cardinal κ, where κ^{+} denotes the successor cardinal of κ.

The first infinite cardinal, $\aleph_0$ (aleph-naught), is a strong limit cardinal, and hence also a weak limit cardinal.

== Constructions ==
One way to construct limit cardinals is via the union operation: $\aleph_{\omega}$ is a weak limit cardinal, defined as the union of all the alephs before it; and in general $\aleph_{\beta}$ for any limit ordinal β is a weak limit cardinal.

The ב operation can be used to obtain strong limit cardinals. This operation is a map from ordinals to cardinals defined as

$$\beth_{0} = \aleph_0,$$
$\beth_{\alpha+1} = 2^{\beth_{\alpha}},$ (the smallest ordinal equinumerous with the powerset of $\beth_{\alpha}$)
If β is a limit ordinal, $\beth_{\beta} = \bigcup \{ \beth_{\alpha} : \alpha < \beta\}.$

The cardinal

$$\beth_{\omega} = \bigcup \{ \beth_{0}, \beth_{1}, \beth_{2}, \ldots \} = \bigcup_{n < \omega}  \beth_{n}$$

is a strong limit cardinal of cofinality ω. More generally, given any ordinal α, the cardinal

$$\beth_{\alpha+\omega} = \bigcup_{n < \omega} \beth_{\alpha+n}$$

is a strong limit cardinal. Thus there are arbitrarily large strong limit cardinals.

== Relationship with ordinal subscripts ==
If the axiom of choice holds, every cardinal number has an initial ordinal. If that initial ordinal is $\omega_{\beta} \,,$ then the cardinal number is of the form $\aleph_\beta$ for the same ordinal subscript β. The ordinal β determines whether $\aleph_\beta$ is a weak limit cardinal. Because $\aleph_{\alpha^+} = (\aleph_\alpha)^+ \,,$ if β is a successor ordinal then $\aleph_\beta$ is not a weak limit. Conversely, if a cardinal κ is a successor cardinal, say $\kappa = (\aleph_{\alpha})^+ \,,$ then $\kappa = \aleph_{\alpha^+} \,.$ Thus, in general, $\aleph_\beta$ is a weak limit cardinal if and only if β is zero or a limit ordinal.

Although the aleph ordinal subscript tells us whether a cardinal is a weak limit, it does not tell us whether a cardinal is a strong limit. For example, ZFC proves that $\aleph_\omega$ is a weak limit cardinal, but neither proves nor disproves that $\aleph_\omega$ is a strong limit cardinal (Hrbacek and Jech 1999:168). The generalized continuum hypothesis states that $\kappa^+ = 2^{\kappa} \,$ for every infinite cardinal κ. Under this hypothesis, the notions of weak and strong limit cardinals coincide.

== The notion of inaccessibility and large cardinals ==
The concepts of weak or strong limit cardinals define notions of "inaccessibility": we are dealing with cases where it is no longer enough to do finitely many iterations of the successor and powerset operations; hence the phrase "cannot be reached" in both of the intuitive definitions above. But the "union operation" always provides another way of "accessing" these cardinals (and indeed, such is the case of limit ordinals as well). Stronger notions of inaccessibility can be defined using cofinality. For a weak (respectively strong) limit cardinal κ the requirement is that cf(κ) = κ (i.e. κ be regular) so that κ cannot be expressed as a sum (union) of fewer than κ smaller cardinals. Such a cardinal is called a weakly (respectively strongly) inaccessible cardinal. The preceding examples of $\aleph_\omega$ and $\beth_\omega$ are both singular cardinals of cofinality ω, and hence they are not inaccessible.

$\aleph_0$ would be an inaccessible cardinal of both "strengths" except that the definition of inaccessible requires that they be uncountable. Standard Zermelo–Fraenkel set theory with the axiom of choice (ZFC) cannot even prove the consistency of the existence of an inaccessible cardinal of either kind above $\aleph_0$, due to Gödel's incompleteness theorem. More specifically, if $\kappa$ is weakly inaccessible then $L_{\kappa} \models ZFC$. Inaccessible cardinals form the first in a hierarchy of large cardinals.
