= Limit ordinal =

Infinite ordinal number class

Representation of the ordinal numbers up to ω^{ω}. Each turn of the spiral represents one power of ω. Limit ordinals are those that are non-zero and have no predecessor, such as ω or ω^{2}

In set theory, a limit ordinal is an ordinal number that is neither zero nor a successor ordinal. Alternatively, an ordinal λ is a limit ordinal if there is an ordinal less than λ, and whenever β is an ordinal less than λ, then there exists an ordinal γ such that β < γ < λ. Every ordinal number is either zero, a successor ordinal, or a limit ordinal.

For example, the smallest limit ordinal is ω, the smallest ordinal greater than every natural number. This is a limit ordinal because for any smaller ordinal (i.e., for any natural number) n we can find another natural number larger than it (e.g. n+1), but still less than ω. The next-smallest limit ordinal is ω+ω. This will be discussed further in the article.

Using the von Neumann definition of ordinals, every ordinal is the well-ordered set of all smaller ordinals. The union of a nonempty set of ordinals that has no greatest element is then always a limit ordinal. Using von Neumann cardinal assignment, every infinite cardinal number is also a limit ordinal.

== Alternative definitions ==
Various other ways to define limit ordinals are:

- It is equal to the supremum of all the ordinals below it, but is not zero. (Compare with a successor ordinal: the set of ordinals below it has a maximum, so the supremum is this maximum, the previous ordinal.)
- It is not zero and has no maximum element.
- It can be written in the form ωα for α > 0. That is, in the Cantor normal form there is no finite number as last term, and the ordinal is nonzero.
- It is a limit point of the class of ordinal numbers, with respect to the order topology. (The other ordinals are isolated points.)

Some contention exists on whether or not 0 should be classified as a limit ordinal, as it does not have an immediate predecessor; some textbooks include 0 in the class of limit ordinals while others exclude it.

== Examples ==
Because the class of ordinal numbers is well-ordered, there is a smallest infinite limit ordinal; denoted by ω (omega). The ordinal ω is also the smallest infinite ordinal (disregarding limit), as it is the least upper bound of the natural numbers. Hence ω represents the order type of the natural numbers. The next limit ordinal above the first is ω + ω = ω·2, which generalizes to ω·n for any natural number n. Taking the union (the supremum operation on any set of ordinals) of all the ω·n, we get ω·ω = ω^{2}, which generalizes to ω^{n} for any natural number n. This process can be further iterated as follows to produce:

$$\omega^3, \omega^4, \ldots, \omega^\omega, \omega^{\omega^\omega}, \ldots, \varepsilon_0 = \omega^{\omega^{\omega^{~\cdot^{~\cdot^{~\cdot}}}}}, \ldots$$

In general, all of these recursive definitions via multiplication, exponentiation, repeated exponentiation, etc. yield limit ordinals. All of the ordinals discussed so far are still countable ordinals. However, there is no recursively enumerable scheme for systematically naming all ordinals less than the Church–Kleene ordinal, which is a countable ordinal.

Beyond the countable, the first uncountable ordinal is usually denoted ω_{1}. It is also a limit ordinal.

Continuing, one can obtain the following (all of which are now increasing in cardinality):

$$\omega_2, \omega_3, \ldots, \omega_\omega, \omega_{\omega + 1}, \ldots, \omega_{\omega_\omega},\ldots$$

In general, we always get a limit ordinal when taking the union of a nonempty set of ordinals that has no maximum element.

The ordinals of the form ω²α, for α > 0, are limits of limits, etc.

== Properties ==
The classes of successor ordinals and limit ordinals (of various cofinalities) as well as zero exhaust the entire class of ordinals, so these cases are often used in proofs by transfinite induction or definitions by transfinite recursion. Limit ordinals represent a sort of "turning point" in such procedures, in which one must use limiting operations such as taking the union over all preceding ordinals. In principle, one could do anything at limit ordinals, but taking the union is continuous in the order topology and this is usually desirable.

If we use the von Neumann cardinal assignment, every infinite cardinal number is also a limit ordinal (and this is a fitting observation, as cardinal derives from the Latin cardo meaning hinge or turning point): the proof of this fact is done by simply showing that every infinite successor ordinal is equinumerous to a limit ordinal via the Hotel Infinity argument.

Cardinal numbers have their own notion of successorship and limit (everything getting upgraded to a higher level).

== Indecomposable ordinals ==
Additively indecomposable

A limit ordinal α is called additively indecomposable if it cannot be expressed as the sum of β < α ordinals less than α. These numbers are any ordinal of the form $\omega^\beta$ for β an ordinal. The smallest is written $\gamma_0$, the second is written $\gamma_1$, etc.

Multiplicatively indecomposable

A limit ordinal α is called multiplicatively indecomposable if it cannot be expressed as the product of β < α ordinals less than α. These numbers are any ordinal of the form $\omega^{\omega^\beta}$ for β an ordinal. The smallest is written $\delta_0$, the second is written $\delta_1$, etc.

Exponentially indecomposable and beyond

The term "exponentially indecomposable" does not refer to ordinals not expressible as the exponential product (?) of β < α ordinals less than α, but rather the epsilon numbers, "tetrationally indecomposable" refers to the zeta numbers, "pentationally indecomposable" refers to the eta numbers, etc.

== See also ==
- Ordinal arithmetic
- Limit cardinal
- Fundamental sequence (ordinals)
