= Projective hierarchy =

Descriptive set theory concept

In the mathematical field of descriptive set theory, a subset $A$ of a Polish space $X$ is projective if it is $\boldsymbol{\Sigma}^1_n$ for some positive integer $n$. Here $A$ is

- $\boldsymbol{\Sigma}^1_1$ if $A$ is analytic
- $\boldsymbol{\Pi}^1_n$ if the complement of $A$ is $\boldsymbol{\Sigma}^1_n$
- $\boldsymbol{\Sigma}^1_{n+1}$ if there is a Polish space $Y$ and a $\boldsymbol{\Pi}^1_n$ subset $C\subseteq X\times Y$ such that $A$ is the projection of $C$ onto $X$; that is, $A=\{x\in X \mid \exists y\in Y : (x,y)\in C\}.$

The choice of the Polish space $Y$ in the third clause above is not very important; it could be replaced in the definition by a fixed uncountable Polish space, say Baire space or Cantor space or the real line.

== Relationship to the analytical hierarchy ==
There is a close relationship between the relativized analytical hierarchy on subsets of Baire space (denoted by lightface letters $\Sigma$ and $\Pi$) and the projective hierarchy on subsets of Baire space (denoted by boldface letters $\boldsymbol{\Sigma}$ and $\boldsymbol{\Pi}$). Not every $\boldsymbol{\Sigma}^1_n$ subset of Baire space is $\Sigma^1_n$. It is true, however, that if a subset X of Baire space is $\boldsymbol{\Sigma}^1_n$ then there is a set of natural numbers A such that X is $\Sigma^{1,A}_n$. A similar statement holds for $\boldsymbol{\Pi}^1_n$ sets. Thus the sets classified by the projective hierarchy are exactly the sets classified by the relativized version of the analytical hierarchy. This relationship is important in effective descriptive set theory. Stated in terms of definability, a set of reals is projective iff it is definable in the language of second-order arithmetic from some real parameter.

A similar relationship between the projective hierarchy and the relativized analytical hierarchy holds for subsets of Cantor space and, more generally, subsets of any effective Polish space.

== Table ==
Pointclasses
Lightface		Boldface	
Σ^{0}_{0} = Π^{0}_{0} = Δ^{0}_{0} (sometimes the same as Δ^{0}_{1})		**Σ^{0}_{0}** = **Π^{0}_{0}** = **Δ^{0}_{0}** (if defined)	
Δ^{0}_{1} = recursive		**Δ^{0}_{1}** = clopen	
Σ^{0}_{1} = recursively enumerable	Π^{0}_{1} = co-recursively enumerable	**Σ^{0}_{1}** = G = open	**Π^{0}_{1}** = F = closed
Δ^{0}_{2}		**Δ^{0}_{2}**	
Σ^{0}_{2}	Π^{0}_{2}	**Σ^{0}_{2}** = F_{σ}	**Π^{0}_{2}** = G_{δ}
Δ^{0}_{3}		**Δ^{0}_{3}**	
Σ^{0}_{3}	Π^{0}_{3}	**Σ^{0}_{3}** = G_{δσ}	**Π^{0}_{3}** = F_{σδ}
⋮		⋮	
Σ^{0}_{<ω} = Π^{0}_{<ω} = Δ^{0}_{<ω} = Σ^{1}_{0} = Π^{1}_{0} = Δ^{1}_{0} = arithmetical		**Σ^{0}_{<ω}** = **Π^{0}_{<ω}** = **Δ^{0}_{<ω}** = **Σ^{1}_{0}** = **Π^{1}_{0}** = **Δ^{1}_{0}** = boldface arithmetical	
⋮		⋮	
Δ^{0}_{α} (α recursive)		**Δ^{0}_{α}** (α countable)	
Σ^{0}_{α}	Π^{0}_{α}	**Σ^{0}_{α}**	**Π^{0}_{α}**
⋮		⋮	
Σ^{0}_{ω^{CK}_{1}} = Π^{0}_{ω^{CK}_{1}} = Δ^{0}_{ω^{CK}_{1}} = Δ^{1}_{1} = hyperarithmetical		**Σ^{0}_{ω_{1}}** = **Π^{0}_{ω_{1}}** = **Δ^{0}_{ω_{1}}** = **Δ^{1}_{1}** = **B** = Borel	
Σ^{1}_{1} = lightface analytic	Π^{1}_{1} = lightface coanalytic	**Σ^{1}_{1}** = A = analytic	**Π^{1}_{1}** = CA = coanalytic
Δ^{1}_{2}		**Δ^{1}_{2}**	
Σ^{1}_{2}	Π^{1}_{2}	**Σ^{1}_{2}** = PCA	**Π^{1}_{2}** = CPCA
Δ^{1}_{3}		**Δ^{1}_{3}**	
Σ^{1}_{3}	Π^{1}_{3}	**Σ^{1}_{3}** = PCPCA	**Π^{1}_{3}** = CPCPCA
⋮		⋮	
Σ^{1}_{<ω} = Π^{1}_{<ω} = Δ^{1}_{<ω} = Σ^{2}_{0} = Π^{2}_{0} = Δ^{2}_{0} = analytical		**Σ^{1}_{<ω}** = **Π^{1}_{<ω}** = **Δ^{1}_{<ω}** = **Σ^{2}_{0}** = **Π^{2}_{0}** = **Δ^{2}_{0}** = **P** = projective	
⋮		⋮	

== See also ==
- Borel hierarchy
