= Suslin =

Suslin or Souslin (Russian: Суслин) is a Russian masculine surname; its feminine counterpart is Suslina or Souslina. It may refer to:

- Alexander Suslin (died 1349), German Orthodox rabbi and Talmudist
- Andrei Suslin (1950–2018), Russian mathematician known for
  - Suslin homology
  - Quillen–Suslin theorem
- Galina Yermolayeva (rower) (née Suslina in 1948), Russian rower
- Inna Suslina (born 1979), Russian team handball player
- Lyudmila Suslina (born 1946), Russian figure skater
- Mikhail Suslin (1894–1919), Russian mathematician known for
  - Suslin algebra
  - Suslin cardinal, a transfinite cardinal number at which one obtains new Suslin sets
  - Suslin operation
  - Suslin's problem
  - Suslin representation, a set of real numbers built up in a certain way
- Sergey Suslin (1944–1989), Soviet judoka and sambo competitor
- Viktor Suslin (1942–2012), Russian composer
- Viktor Suslin (rower) (born 1944), Russian Olympic rower
- Yury Suslin (born 1935), Russian Olympic rower, brother of Viktor

== See also ==
- Suslin's theorem (disambiguation), several theorems by Andrei or Mikhail
