= Suslin–Kleene theorem =

Characterization of hyperarithmetic sets

In effective descriptive set theory, the Suslin–Kleene theorem characterizes the hyperarithmetic subsets of $\N$. Informally, it states that the hyperarithmetic, i.e., lightface $\Delta^1_1$ subsets of $\N$ form the “effective” σ-algebra “effectively” generated by the singletons. This is an effective analog of Suslin's theorem, which states that the subsets of a Polish space which are boldface $\mathbf{\Delta}^1_1$, i.e., both analytic and co-analytic, are exactly the Borel subsets, which form the σ-algebra generated by open subsets.

== Statement ==
Let $X$ be a set. A modest assembly structure on $X$ is a function which maps every $x \in X$ to a non-empty subset $E(x) \subseteq \N$, whose elements are called the realizers of $x$, such that different elements do not share realizers: $E(x)$ and $E(y)$ are disjoint for $x \neq y$. The realizers of $x$ are intuitively understood as concrete computational representations of the abstract element $x$.

The Suslin–Kleene theorem states that the class of hyperarithmetic subsets of $\N$ is the least $\Gamma \subseteq \mathcal{P}(\N)$ such that there exists a modest assembly structure on $\Gamma$ for which the following conditions are satisfied:

1. For all $n \in \N$, the singleton $\{n\}$ belongs to $\Gamma$. Moreover, there exists a (total) computable function $S : \N \to \N$ such that $S(n)$ realizes $\{n\}$ for all $n$.
2. For all $P \in \Gamma$, the complement $P^c$ belongs to $\Gamma$. Moreover, there exists a computable function $C : \N \to \N$ such that $C(n)$ realizes $P^c$ for all $P \in \Gamma$ and for all $n \in \N$ realizing $P$.
3. For all sequence of subsets $P_n \in \Gamma$, if there exists a computable function $r : \N \to \N$ such that $r(n)$ realizes $P_n$ for all $n$, then the union $\bigcup_{n \in \N} P_n$ belongs to $\Gamma$. Moreover, there exists a computable function $U$ such that $U(e)$ realizes $\bigcup_{n \in \N} P_n$ for all sequence $P_n \in \Gamma$ and for all $e \in \N$ such that $\phi_e(n)$ is defined and realizes $P_n$ for all $n$.
