= Inductive set =

Bourbaki also defines an inductive set to be a partially ordered set that satisfies the hypothesis of Zorn's lemma when nonempty.

In descriptive set theory, an inductive set of real numbers (or more generally, an inductive subset of a Polish space) is one that can be defined as the least fixed point of a monotone operation definable by a positive Σ^{1}_{n} formula, for some natural number n, together with a real parameter.

The inductive sets form a boldface pointclass; that is, they are closed under continuous preimages. In the Wadge hierarchy, they lie above the projective sets and below the sets in L(R). Assuming sufficient determinacy, the class of inductive sets has the scale property and thus the prewellordering property.

The term can have a number of different meanings:

- Russell's definition, an inductive set is a nonempty partially ordered set in which every element has a successor. An example is the set of natural numbers N, where 0 is the first element, and the others are produced by adding 1 successively.
- Roitman considers the same construction in a more concrete form: the elements are sets, the empty set $\emptyset$ among them, and the successor of every element $y$ is the set $y\cup \{y\}$. In particular, every inductive set contains the sequence $\emptyset,\{\emptyset\},\{\emptyset,\{\emptyset\}\},\{\emptyset,\{\emptyset\},\{\emptyset,\{\emptyset\}\}\},\dots$.
- For many other authors (e.g., Bourbaki), an inductive set is a partially ordered set in which every totally ordered subset has an upper bound, i.e., it is a set fulfilling the assumption of Zorn's lemma.
