= Mikhail Suslin =

Russian mathematician

Mikhail Y. Suslin
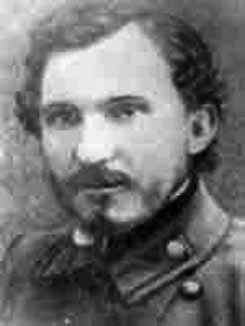
- Born: 15 November 1894; Krasavka, Saratov Oblast
- Died: 21 October 1919 (aged 24); Krasavka, Saratov Oblast
- Scientific career
- Fields: General topology, descriptive set theory

Mikhail Yakovlevich Suslin (sometimes transliterated Souslin; Russian: Михаи́л Я́ковлевич Су́слин; November 15, 1894 – 21 October 1919, Krasavka) was a Russian mathematician who made major contributions to the fields of general topology and descriptive set theory.

== Biography ==
Mikhail Suslin was born on November 15, 1894, in the village of Krasavka, the only child of poor peasants Yakov Gavrilovich and Matrena Vasil'evna Suslin. From a young age, Suslin showed a keen interest in mathematics and was encouraged to continue his education by his primary school teacher, Vera Andreevna Teplogorskaya-Smirnova. From 1905 to 1913 he attended Balashov boys' grammar school.

In 1913, Suslin enrolled at the Imperial Moscow University and studied under the tutelage of Nikolai Luzin. He graduated with a degree in mathematics in 1917 and immediately began working at the Ivanovo-Voznesensk Polytechnic Institute.

Suslin died of typhus in the 1919 Moscow epidemic following the Russian Civil War, at the age of 24.

== Work ==
His name is associated to Suslin's problem, a question relating to totally ordered sets that was eventually found to be independent of the standard system of set-theoretic axioms, ZFC.

He contributed greatly to the theory of analytic sets, sometimes called after him, a kind of a set of reals that is definable via trees. In fact, while he was a research student of Nikolai Luzin (in 1917) he found an error in an argument of Lebesgue, who believed he had proved that for any Borel set in $\R^2$, the projection onto the real axis was also a Borel set.

=== Publications ===
Suslin only published one paper during his life: a 4-page note.

- Souslin, M. Ya. (1917), "Sur une définition des ensembles mesurables B sans nombres transfinis", C. R. Acad. Sci. Paris, 164: 88–91
- Souslin, M. (1920), "Problème 3" (PDF), Fundamenta Mathematicae, 1: 223, doi:10.4064/fm-1-1-223-224
- Souslin, M. Ya. (1923), Kuratowski, C. (ed.), "Sur un corps dénombrable de nombres réels", Fundamenta Mathematicae (in French), 4: 311–315, doi:10.4064/fm-4-1-311-315, JFM 49.0147.03

== See also ==
1. A Suslin algebra is a Boolean algebra that is complete, atomless, countably distributive, and satisfies the countable chain condition.
2. A Suslin cardinal is a cardinal λ such that there exists a set P ⊆ 2^{ω} such that P is λ-Suslin but P is not λ'-Suslin for any λ' < λ.
3. The Suslin hypothesis says that Suslin lines do not exist.
4. A Suslin line is a complete dense unbounded totally ordered set satisfying the countable chain condition and not order-isomorphic to the real line.
5. The Suslin number is the supremum of the cardinalities of families of disjoint open non-empty sets.
6. The Suslin operation, usually denoted by A, is an operation that constructs a set from a Suslin scheme.
7. The Suslin problem asks whether Suslin lines exist.
8. The Suslin property states that there is no uncountable family of pairwise disjoint non-empty open subsets.
9. A Suslin representation of a set of reals is a tree whose projection is that set of reals.
10. A Suslin scheme is a function with domain the finite sequences of positive integers.
11. A Suslin set is a set that is the image of a tree under a certain projection.
12. A Suslin space is the image of a Polish space under a continuous mapping.
13. A Suslin subset is a subset that is the image of a tree under a certain projection.
14. The Suslin theorem about analytic sets states that a set that is analytic and coanalytic is Borel.
15. A Suslin tree is a tree of height ω_{1} such that every branch and every antichain is at most countable.
