= Suslin's theorem =

In mathematics, Suslin's theorem may refer to:

- The Quillen–Suslin theorem (formerly the Serre conjecture), due to Andrei Suslin.
- Any of several theorems about analytic sets due to Mikhail Yakovlevich Suslin; in particular:
  - There is an analytic subset of the reals that is not Borel
  - An analytic set whose complement is also analytic is a Borel set, a special case of the Lusin separation theorem
  - Any analytic set in R^{n} is the projection of a Borel set in R^{n+1}
  - Analytic sets can be constructed using the Suslin operation
