= Fσ set =

Countable union of closed sets

In general topology, an F_{σ} set (pronounced F-sigma set) is a countable union of closed sets. The notation originated in French with F for fermé (French: closed) and σ for somme (French: sum, union).

The complement of an F_{σ} set is a G_{δ} set.

F_{σ} is the same as $\mathbf{\Sigma}^0_2$ in the Borel hierarchy.

== Examples ==
Each closed set is an F_{σ} set.

The set $\mathbb{Q}$ of rationals is an F_{σ} set in $\mathbb{R}$. More generally, any countable set in a T_{1} space is an F_{σ} set, because every singleton $\{x\}$ is closed.

The set $\mathbb{R}\setminus\mathbb{Q}$ of irrationals is not an F_{σ} set.

In metrizable spaces, every open set is an F_{σ} set.

The intersection or union of finitely many F_{σ} sets is an F_{σ} set.

Assuming the Axiom of countable choice, the union of countably many F_{σ} sets is an F_{σ} set.

The set $A$ of all points $(x,y)$ in the Cartesian plane such that $x/y$ is rational is an F_{σ} set because it can be expressed as the union of all the lines passing through the origin with rational slope:

$$A = \bigcup_{r \in \mathbb{Q}} \{(ry,y) \mid y \in \mathbb{R}\},$$

where $\mathbb{Q}$ is the set of rational numbers, which is a countable set.

== See also ==
- G_{δ} set — the dual notion.
- Borel hierarchy
- P-space, any space having the property that every F_{σ} set is closed

Pointclasses
Lightface		Boldface	
Σ^{0}_{0} = Π^{0}_{0} = Δ^{0}_{0} (sometimes the same as Δ^{0}_{1})		**Σ^{0}_{0}** = **Π^{0}_{0}** = **Δ^{0}_{0}** (if defined)	
Δ^{0}_{1} = recursive		**Δ^{0}_{1}** = clopen	
Σ^{0}_{1} = recursively enumerable	Π^{0}_{1} = co-recursively enumerable	**Σ^{0}_{1}** = G = open	**Π^{0}_{1}** = F = closed
Δ^{0}_{2}		**Δ^{0}_{2}**	
Σ^{0}_{2}	Π^{0}_{2}	**Σ^{0}_{2}** = F_{σ}	**Π^{0}_{2}** = G_{δ}
Δ^{0}_{3}		**Δ^{0}_{3}**	
Σ^{0}_{3}	Π^{0}_{3}	**Σ^{0}_{3}** = G_{δσ}	**Π^{0}_{3}** = F_{σδ}
⋮		⋮	
Σ^{0}_{<ω} = Π^{0}_{<ω} = Δ^{0}_{<ω} = Σ^{1}_{0} = Π^{1}_{0} = Δ^{1}_{0} = arithmetical		**Σ^{0}_{<ω}** = **Π^{0}_{<ω}** = **Δ^{0}_{<ω}** = **Σ^{1}_{0}** = **Π^{1}_{0}** = **Δ^{1}_{0}** = boldface arithmetical	
⋮		⋮	
Δ^{0}_{α} (α recursive)		**Δ^{0}_{α}** (α countable)	
Σ^{0}_{α}	Π^{0}_{α}	**Σ^{0}_{α}**	**Π^{0}_{α}**
⋮		⋮	
Σ^{0}_{ω^{CK}_{1}} = Π^{0}_{ω^{CK}_{1}} = Δ^{0}_{ω^{CK}_{1}} = Δ^{1}_{1} = hyperarithmetical		**Σ^{0}_{ω_{1}}** = **Π^{0}_{ω_{1}}** = **Δ^{0}_{ω_{1}}** = **Δ^{1}_{1}** = **B** = Borel	
Σ^{1}_{1} = lightface analytic	Π^{1}_{1} = lightface coanalytic	**Σ^{1}_{1}** = A = analytic	**Π^{1}_{1}** = CA = coanalytic
Δ^{1}_{2}		**Δ^{1}_{2}**	
Σ^{1}_{2}	Π^{1}_{2}	**Σ^{1}_{2}** = PCA	**Π^{1}_{2}** = CPCA
Δ^{1}_{3}		**Δ^{1}_{3}**	
Σ^{1}_{3}	Π^{1}_{3}	**Σ^{1}_{3}** = PCPCA	**Π^{1}_{3}** = CPCPCA
⋮		⋮	
Σ^{1}_{<ω} = Π^{1}_{<ω} = Δ^{1}_{<ω} = Σ^{2}_{0} = Π^{2}_{0} = Δ^{2}_{0} = analytical		**Σ^{1}_{<ω}** = **Π^{1}_{<ω}** = **Δ^{1}_{<ω}** = **Σ^{2}_{0}** = **Π^{2}_{0}** = **Δ^{2}_{0}** = **P** = projective	
⋮		⋮	
