= Yiannis N. Moschovakis =

American logician (born 1938)

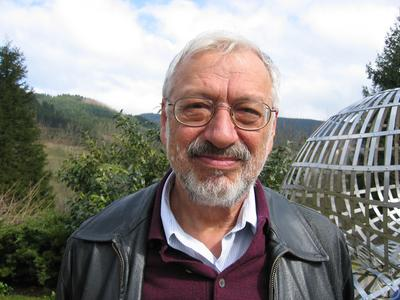
- Moschovakis in 2005
- Born: Yiannis Nicolas Moschovakis; January 18, 1938 (age 88); Athens, Greece
- Education: University of Wisconsin–Madison
- Known for: Effective descriptive set theory
- Scientific career
- Fields: Mathematics
- Workplaces: UCLA
- Doctoral advisor: Stephen Kleene
- Doctoral students: Alexander S. Kechris; Phokion G. Kolaitis; Katherine St. John; Benedict Freedman

Yiannis Nicolas Moschovakis (Greek: Γιάννης Μοσχοβάκης; born January 18, 1938) is a set theorist, descriptive set theorist, and recursion (computability) theorist, at UCLA.

His book Descriptive Set Theory (North-Holland) is the primary reference for the subject. He is especially associated with the development of the effective, or lightface, version of descriptive set theory, and he is known for the Moschovakis coding lemma that is named after him.

== Biography ==
Moschovakis earned his Ph.D. from the University of Wisconsin–Madison in 1963 under the direction of Stephen Kleene, with a dissertation entitled Recursive Analysis. In 2015, he was elected as a fellow of the American Mathematical Society "for contributions to mathematical logic, especially set theory and computability theory, and for exposition".

For many years, he has split his time between UCLA and the University of Athens (he retired from the latter in July 2005).

Moschovakis is married to Joan Moschovakis, with whom he gave the 2014 Lindström Lectures at the University of Gothenburg.

== Publications ==
- Elementary induction on abstract structures. North-Holland. 1974. 2nd edn. Dover. 2008. ISBN 9780486152011.
- Descriptive set theory. North-Holland. 1980. ISBN 9780444853059. 2nd edn. 2005. Second edition available online
- Notes on set theory. North-Holland. 1994. ISBN 9783540941804. 2nd edn. 2005.
