= Pointclass =

Descriptive set theory concept

In the mathematical field of descriptive set theory, a pointclass is a collection of sets of points, where a point is ordinarily understood to be an element of some perfect Polish space. In practice, a pointclass is usually characterized by some sort of definability property; for example, the collection of all open sets in some fixed collection of Polish spaces is a pointclass. (An open set may be seen as in some sense definable because it cannot be a purely arbitrary collection of points; for any point in the set, all points sufficiently close to that point must also be in the set.)

Pointclasses find application in formulating many important principles and theorems from set theory and real analysis. Strong set-theoretic principles may be stated in terms of the determinacy of various pointclasses, which in turn implies that sets in those pointclasses (or sometimes larger ones) have regularity properties such as Lebesgue measurability (and indeed universal measurability), the property of Baire, and the perfect set property.

== Basic framework ==
In practice, descriptive set theorists often simplify matters by working in a fixed Polish space such as Baire space or sometimes Cantor space, each of which has the advantage of being zero dimensional, and indeed homeomorphic to its finite or countable powers, so that considerations of dimensionality never arise. Yiannis Moschovakis provides greater generality by fixing once and for all a collection of underlying Polish spaces, including the set of all naturals, the set of all reals, Baire space, and Cantor space, and otherwise allowing the reader to throw in any desired perfect Polish space. Then he defines a product space to be any finite Cartesian product of these underlying spaces. Then, for example, the pointclass $\boldsymbol{\Sigma}^0_1$ of all open sets means the collection of all open subsets of one of these product spaces. This approach prevents $\boldsymbol{\Sigma}^0_1$ from being a proper class, while avoiding excessive specificity as to the particular Polish spaces being considered (given that the focus is on the fact that $\boldsymbol{\Sigma}^0_1$ is the collection of open sets, not on the spaces themselves).

== Boldface pointclasses ==
The pointclasses in the Borel hierarchy, and in the more complex projective hierarchy, are represented by sub- and super-scripted Greek letters in boldface fonts; for example, $\boldsymbol{\Pi}^0_1$ is the pointclass of all closed sets, $\boldsymbol{\Sigma}^0_2$ is the pointclass of all F_{σ} sets, $\boldsymbol{\Delta}^0_2$ is the collection of all sets that are simultaneously F_{σ} and G_{δ}, and $\boldsymbol{\Sigma}^1_1$ is the pointclass of all analytic sets.

Sets in such pointclasses need be "definable" only up to a point. For example, every singleton set in a Polish space is closed, and thus $\boldsymbol{\Pi}^0_1$. Therefore, it cannot be that every $\boldsymbol{\Pi}^0_1$ set must be "more definable" than an arbitrary element of a Polish space (say, an arbitrary real number, or an arbitrary countable sequence of natural numbers). Boldface pointclasses, however, may (and in practice ordinarily do) require that sets in the class be definable relative to some real number, taken as an oracle. In that sense, membership in a boldface pointclass is a definability property, even though it is not absolute definability, but only definability with respect to a possibly undefinable real number.

Boldface pointclasses, or at least the ones ordinarily considered, are closed under Wadge reducibility; that is, given a set in the pointclass, its inverse image under a continuous function (from a product space to the space of which the given set is a subset) is also in the given pointclass. Thus a boldface pointclass is a downward-closed union of Wadge degrees.

== Lightface pointclasses ==
The Borel and projective hierarchies have analogs in effective descriptive set theory in which the definability property is no longer relativized to an oracle, but is made absolute. For example, if one fixes some collection of basic open neighborhoods (say, in Baire space, the collection of sets of the form {x∈ω^{ω} $\mid$ s is an initial segment of x} for each fixed finite sequence s of natural numbers), then the open, or $\boldsymbol{\Sigma}^0_1$, sets may be characterized as all (arbitrary) unions of basic open neighborhoods. The analogous $\Sigma^0_1$ sets, with a lightface $\Sigma$, are no longer arbitrary unions of such neighborhoods, but computable unions of them. That is, a set is lightface $\Sigma^0_1$, also called effectively open, if there is a computable set S of finite sequences of naturals such that the given set is the union of the sets {x∈ω^{ω} $\mid$ s is an initial segment of x} for s in S.

A set is lightface $\Pi^0_1$ if it is the complement of a $\Sigma^0_1$ set. Thus each $\Sigma^0_1$ set has at least one index, which describes the computable function enumerating the basic open sets from which it is composed; in fact it will have infinitely many such indices. Similarly, an index for a $\Pi^0_1$ set B describes the computable function enumerating the basic open sets in the complement of B.

A set A is lightface $\Sigma^0_2$ if it is a union of a computable sequence of $\Pi^0_1$ sets (that is, there is a computable enumeration of indices of $\Pi^0_1$ sets such that A is the union of these sets). This relationship between lightface sets and their indices is used to extend the lightface Borel hierarchy into the transfinite, via recursive ordinals. This produces the hyperarithmetic hierarchy, which is the lightface analog of the Borel hierarchy. (The finite levels of the hyperarithmetic hierarchy are known as the arithmetical hierarchy.)

A similar treatment can be applied to the projective hierarchy. Its lightface analog is known as the analytical hierarchy.

== Summary ==
Each class is at least as large as the classes above it.

Pointclasses
Lightface		Boldface	
Σ^{0}_{0} = Π^{0}_{0} = Δ^{0}_{0} (sometimes the same as Δ^{0}_{1})		**Σ^{0}_{0}** = **Π^{0}_{0}** = **Δ^{0}_{0}** (if defined)	
Δ^{0}_{1} = recursive		**Δ^{0}_{1}** = clopen	
Σ^{0}_{1} = recursively enumerable	Π^{0}_{1} = co-recursively enumerable	**Σ^{0}_{1}** = G = open	**Π^{0}_{1}** = F = closed
Δ^{0}_{2}		**Δ^{0}_{2}**	
Σ^{0}_{2}	Π^{0}_{2}	**Σ^{0}_{2}** = F_{σ}	**Π^{0}_{2}** = G_{δ}
Δ^{0}_{3}		**Δ^{0}_{3}**	
Σ^{0}_{3}	Π^{0}_{3}	**Σ^{0}_{3}** = G_{δσ}	**Π^{0}_{3}** = F_{σδ}
⋮		⋮	
Σ^{0}_{<ω} = Π^{0}_{<ω} = Δ^{0}_{<ω} = Σ^{1}_{0} = Π^{1}_{0} = Δ^{1}_{0} = arithmetical		**Σ^{0}_{<ω}** = **Π^{0}_{<ω}** = **Δ^{0}_{<ω}** = **Σ^{1}_{0}** = **Π^{1}_{0}** = **Δ^{1}_{0}** = boldface arithmetical	
⋮		⋮	
Δ^{0}_{α} (α recursive)		**Δ^{0}_{α}** (α countable)	
Σ^{0}_{α}	Π^{0}_{α}	**Σ^{0}_{α}**	**Π^{0}_{α}**
⋮		⋮	
Σ^{0}_{ω^{CK}_{1}} = Π^{0}_{ω^{CK}_{1}} = Δ^{0}_{ω^{CK}_{1}} = Δ^{1}_{1} = hyperarithmetical		**Σ^{0}_{ω_{1}}** = **Π^{0}_{ω_{1}}** = **Δ^{0}_{ω_{1}}** = **Δ^{1}_{1}** = **B** = Borel	
Σ^{1}_{1} = lightface analytic	Π^{1}_{1} = lightface coanalytic	**Σ^{1}_{1}** = A = analytic	**Π^{1}_{1}** = CA = coanalytic
Δ^{1}_{2}		**Δ^{1}_{2}**	
Σ^{1}_{2}	Π^{1}_{2}	**Σ^{1}_{2}** = PCA	**Π^{1}_{2}** = CPCA
Δ^{1}_{3}		**Δ^{1}_{3}**	
Σ^{1}_{3}	Π^{1}_{3}	**Σ^{1}_{3}** = PCPCA	**Π^{1}_{3}** = CPCPCA
⋮		⋮	
Σ^{1}_{<ω} = Π^{1}_{<ω} = Δ^{1}_{<ω} = Σ^{2}_{0} = Π^{2}_{0} = Δ^{2}_{0} = analytical		**Σ^{1}_{<ω}** = **Π^{1}_{<ω}** = **Δ^{1}_{<ω}** = **Σ^{2}_{0}** = **Π^{2}_{0}** = **Δ^{2}_{0}** = **P** = projective	
⋮		⋮	
