= Lusin's separation theorem =

Mathematical theorem

In descriptive set theory and mathematical logic, Lusin's separation theorem states that if A and B are disjoint analytic subsets of Polish space, then there is a Borel set C in the space such that A ⊆ C and B ∩ C = ∅. It is named after Nikolai Luzin, who proved it in 1927.

The theorem can be generalized to show that for each sequence (A_{n}) of disjoint analytic sets there is a sequence (B_{n}) of disjoint Borel sets such that A_{n} ⊆ B_{n} for each n.

An immediate consequence is Suslin's theorem, which states that if a set and its complement are both analytic, then the set is Borel.
