= Honest leftmost branch =

In set theory, an honest leftmost branch of a tree T on ω × γ is a branch (maximal chain) ƒ ∈ [T] such that for each branch g ∈ [T], one has ∀ n ∈ ω : ƒ(n) ≤ g(n). Here, [T] denotes the set of branches of maximal length of T, ω is the smallest infinite ordinal (represented by the natural numbers N), and γ is some other ordinal.

== See also ==
- Scale (computing)
- Suslin set
