= Moschovakis coding lemma =

The Moschovakis coding lemma is a lemma from descriptive set theory involving sets of real numbers under the axiom of determinacy (the principle — incompatible with choice — that every two-player integer game is determined). The lemma was developed and named after the mathematician Yiannis N. Moschovakis.

The lemma may be expressed generally as follows:

Let Γ be a non-selfdual pointclass closed under real quantification and ∧, and ≺ a Γ-well-founded relation on ω^{ω} of rank θ ∈ ON. Let R ⊆ dom(≺) × ω^{ω} be such that (∀x∈dom(≺))(∃y)(x R y). Then there is a Γ-set A ⊆ dom(≺) × ω^{ω} which is a choice set for R, that is:

1. (∀α<θ)(∃x∈dom(≺),y)(|x|_{≺}=α ∧ x A y).
2. (∀x,y)(x A y → x R y).

A proof runs as follows: suppose for contradiction θ is a minimal counterexample, and fix ≺, R, and a good universal set U ⊆ (ω^{ω})^{3} for the Γ-subsets of (ω^{ω})^{2}. Easily, θ must be a limit ordinal. For δ < θ, we say u ∈ ω^{ω} codes a δ-choice set provided the property (1) holds for α ≤ δ using A = U u and property (2) holds for A = U u where we replace x ∈ dom(≺) with x ∈ dom(≺) ∧ |x| ≺ [≤δ]. By minimality of θ, for all δ < θ, there are δ-choice sets.

Now, play a game where players I, II select points u,v ∈ ω^{ω} and II wins when u coding a δ_{1}-choice set for some δ_{1} < θ implies v codes a δ_{2}-choice set for some δ_{2} > δ_{1}. A winning strategy for I defines a Σ^{1}_{1} set B of reals encoding δ-choice sets for arbitrarily large δ < θ. Define then

x A y ↔ (∃w∈B)U(w,x,y),

which easily works. On the other hand, suppose τ is a winning strategy for II. From the S m
n theorem, let s:(ω^{ω})^{2} → ω^{ω} be continuous such that for all ϵ, x, t, and w,

U(s(ϵ,x),t,w) ↔ (∃y,z)(y ≺ x ∧ U(ϵ,y,z) ∧ U(z,t,w)).

By the recursion theorem, there exists ϵ_{0} such that U(ϵ_{0},x,z) ↔ z = τ(s(ϵ_{0},x)). A straightforward induction on |x|_{≺} for x ∈ dom(≺) shows that

(∀x∈dom(≺))(∃!z)U(ϵ_{0},x,z),

and

(∀x∈dom(≺),z)(U(ϵ_{0},x,z) → z encodes a choice set of ordinal ≥|x|_{≺}).

So let

x A y ↔ (∃z∈dom(≺),w)(U(ϵ_{0},z,w) ∧ U(w,x,y)).
