= Glossary of game theory =

Game theory is the branch of mathematics in which games are studied: that is, models describing human behaviour. This is a glossary of some terms of the subject.

== Definitions of a game ==
=== Notational conventions ===
Real numbers
$$\mathbb{R}$$.
The set of players
$$\mathrm{N}$$.
Strategy space
$\Sigma\ = \prod_{i \in \mathrm{N}} \Sigma\ ^i$, where
Player i's strategy space
$\Sigma\ ^i$ is the space of all possible ways in which player i can play the game.
A strategy for player i

$\sigma\ _i$ is an element of $\Sigma\ ^i$.

Complements

$\sigma\ _{-i}$ an element of $\Sigma\ ^{-i} = \prod_{ j \in \mathrm{N}, j \ne i} \Sigma\ ^j$, is a tuple of strategies for all players other than i.

Outcome space
$\Gamma$ is in most textbooks identical to -
Payoffs
$\mathbb{R} ^ \mathrm{N}$, describing how much gain (money, pleasure, etc.) the players are allocated by the end of the game.

=== Normal form game ===
A game in normal form is a function:

$$\pi\ : \prod_{i\in \mathrm{N}} \Sigma\ ^ i \to \mathbb{R}^\mathrm{N}$$

Given the tuple of strategies chosen by the players, one is given an allocation of payments (given as real numbers).

A further generalization can be achieved by splitting the game into a composition of two functions:

$$\pi\ : \prod_{i \in \mathrm{N}} \Sigma\ ^i \to \Gamma$$

the outcome function of the game (some authors call this function "the game form"), and:

$$\nu\ : \Gamma\ \to \mathbb{R}^\mathrm{N}$$

the allocation of payoffs (or preferences) to players, for each outcome of the game.

=== Extensive form game ===
This is given by a tree, where at each vertex of the tree a different player has the choice of choosing an edge. The outcome set of an extensive form game is usually the set of tree leaves.

=== Cooperative game ===
A game in which players are allowed to form coalitions (and to enforce coalitionary discipline). A cooperative game is given by stating a value for every coalition:

$$\nu\ : 2^{\mathbb{P}(N)} \to \mathbb{R}$$

It is always assumed that the empty coalition gains nil. Solution concepts for cooperative games usually assume that the players are forming the grand coalition $N$, whose value $\nu(N)$ is then divided among the players to give an allocation.

=== Simple game ===
A Simple game is a simplified form of a cooperative game, where the possible gain is assumed to be either '0' or '1'. A simple game is couple (N, W), where W is the list of "winning" coalitions, capable of gaining the loot ('1'), and N is the set of players.

== Glossary ==
Acceptable game
is a game form such that for every possible preference profiles, the game has pure nash equilibria, all of which are pareto efficient.

Allocation of goods
is a function $\nu\ : \Gamma\ \to \mathbb{R} ^\mathrm{N}$. The allocation is a cardinal approach for determining the good (e.g. money) the players are granted under the different outcomes of the game.

Best reply
the best reply to a given complement $\sigma\ _{-i}$ is a strategy $\tau\ _i$ that maximizes player i's payment. Formally, we want:
$\forall \sigma\ _i \in\ \Sigma\ ^i \quad \quad \pi\ (\sigma\ _i ,\sigma\ _{-i} ) \le \pi\ (\tau\ _i ,\sigma\ _{-i} )$.

Coalition
is any subset of the set of players: $\mathrm{S} \subseteq \mathrm{N}$.

Condorcet winner
Given a preference ν on the outcome space, an outcome a is a condorcet winner if all non-dummy players prefer a to all other outcomes.

Decidability
In relation to game theory, refers to the question of the existence of an algorithm that can and will return an answer as to whether a game can be solved or not.

Determinacy
A subfield of set theory that examines the conditions under which one or the other player of a game has a winning strategy, and the consequences of the existence of such strategies. Games studied in set theory are Gale–Stewart games – two-player games of perfect information in which the players make an infinite sequence of moves and there are no draws.

Determined game (or Strictly determined game)
In game theory, a strictly determined game is a two-player zero-sum game that has at least one Nash equilibrium with both players using pure strategies.

Dictator
A player is a strong dictator if he can guarantee any outcome regardless of the other players. $m \in \mathbb{N}$ is a weak dictator if he can guarantee any outcome, but his strategies for doing so might depend on the complement strategy vector. Naturally, every strong dictator is a weak dictator. Formally:
n is a Strong dictator if:
$\forall a \in \mathrm{A}, \; \exist \sigma\ _n \in \Sigma\ ^n \; s.t. \; \forall \sigma\ _{-n} \in \Sigma\ ^{-n}: \; \Gamma\ (\sigma\ _{-n},\sigma\ _n) = a$
m is a Weak dictator if:
$\forall a \in \mathrm{A}, \; \forall \sigma\ _{-m} \in \Sigma\ ^{-m} \; \exist \sigma\ _m \in \Sigma\ ^m \; s.t. \; \Gamma\ (\sigma\ _{-m},\sigma\ _m) = a$
Another way to put it is:

A strong dictator is $\alpha$-effective for every possible outcome.
A weak dictator is $\beta$-effective for every possible outcome.
A game can have no more than one strong dictator. Some games have multiple weak dictators (in rock-paper-scissors both players are weak dictators but none is a strong dictator).

Also see Effectiveness. Antonym: dummy.

Dominated outcome
Given a preference ν on the outcome space, we say that an outcome a is dominated by outcome b (hence, b is the dominant strategy) if it is preferred by all players. If, in addition, some player strictly prefers b over a, then we say that a is strictly dominated. Formally:
$\forall j \in \mathrm{N} \; \quad \nu\ _j (a) \le\ \nu\ _j (b)$ for domination, and
$\exists i \in \mathrm{N} \; s.t. \; \nu\ _i (a) < \nu\ _i (b)$ for strict domination.
An outcome a is (strictly) dominated if it is (strictly) dominated by some other outcome.
An outcome a is dominated for a coalition S if all players in S prefer some other outcome to a. See also Condorcet winner.

Dominated strategy
we say that strategy is (strongly) dominated by strategy $\tau\ _i$ if for any complement strategies tuple $\sigma\ _{-i}$, player i benefits by playing $\tau\ _i$. Formally speaking:
$\forall \sigma\ _{-i} \in\ \Sigma\ ^{-i} \quad \quad \pi\ (\sigma\ _i ,\sigma\ _{-i} ) \le \pi\ (\tau\ _i ,\sigma\ _{-i} )$ and
$\exists \sigma\ _{-i} \in\ \Sigma\ ^{-i} \quad s.t. \quad \pi\ (\sigma\ _i ,\sigma\ _{-i} ) < \pi\ (\tau\ _i ,\sigma\ _{-i} )$.
A strategy σ is (strictly) dominated if it is (strictly) dominated by some other strategy.

Dummy
A player i is a dummy if he has no effect on the outcome of the game. I.e. if the outcome of the game is insensitive to player i's strategy.
Antonyms: say, veto, dictator.

Effectiveness
A coalition (or a single player) S is effective for a if it can force a to be the outcome of the game. S is α-effective if the members of S have strategies s.t. no matter what the complement of S does, the outcome will be a.
S is β-effective if for any strategies of the complement of S, the members of S can answer with strategies that ensure outcome a.

Finite game
is a game with finitely many players, each of which has a finite set of strategies.

Grand coalition
refers to the coalition containing all players. In cooperative games it is often assumed that the grand coalition forms and the purpose of the game is to find stable imputations.

Mixed strategy
for player i is a probability distribution P on $\Sigma\ ^i$. It is understood that player i chooses a strategy randomly according to P.

Mixed Nash Equilibrium
Same as Pure Nash Equilibrium, defined on the space of mixed strategies. Every finite game has Mixed Nash Equilibria.

Pareto efficiency
An outcome a of game form π is (strongly) pareto efficient if it is undominated under all preference profiles.

Preference profile
is a function $\nu\ : \Gamma\ \to \mathbb{R} ^\mathrm{N}$. This is the ordinal approach at describing the outcome of the game. The preference describes how 'pleased' the players are with the possible outcomes of the game. See allocation of goods.

Pure Nash Equilibrium
An element $\sigma\ = (\sigma\ _i) _ {i \in \mathrm{N}}$ of the strategy space of a game is a pure nash equilibrium point if no player i can benefit by deviating from his strategy $\sigma\ _i$, given that the other players are playing in $\sigma$. Formally:
$\forall i \in \mathrm{N} \quad \forall \tau\ _i \in\ \Sigma\ ^i \quad \pi\ (\tau\ ,\sigma\ _{-i} ) \le \pi\ (\sigma\ )$.
No equilibrium point is dominated.

Say
A player i has a Say if he is not a Dummy, i.e. if there is some tuple of complement strategies s.t. π (σ_i) is not a constant function.
Antonym: Dummy.

Shannon number
A conservative lower bound of the game-tree complexity of chess (10^{120}).

Solved game
A game whose outcome (win, lose or draw) can be correctly predicted assuming perfect play from all players.

Value
A value of a game is a rationally expected outcome. There are more than a few definitions of value, describing different methods of obtaining a solution to the game.

Veto
A veto denotes the ability (or right) of some player to prevent a specific alternative from being the outcome of the game. A player who has that ability is called a veto player.
Antonym: Dummy.

Weakly acceptable game
is a game that has pure nash equilibria some of which are pareto efficient.

Zero sum game
is a game in which the allocation is constant over different outcomes. Formally:
$\forall \gamma\ \in \Gamma\ \sum_{i \in \mathrm{N}} \nu\ _i (\gamma\ ) = const.$
w.l.g. we can assume that constant to be zero. In a zero-sum game, one player's gain is another player's loss. Most classical board games (e.g. chess, checkers) are zero sum.
