= Hyperjump =

Hyperjump may refer to:

- Hyperjump, a function in hyperarithmetical theory, a subtopic of computability theory
- Hyperjump, a fictional hyperspace jump, science fiction space travel
