= Point class =

Point class may refer to

- Pointclass sets in mathematics
- Point-class sealift ship
- Point-class cutter
