= Effective Polish space =

In mathematical logic, an effective Polish space is a complete separable metric space that has a computable presentation. Such spaces are studied in effective descriptive set theory and in constructive analysis. In particular, standard examples of Polish spaces such as the real line, the Cantor set and the Baire space are all effective Polish spaces.

Formally, an effective Polish space is a complete separable metric space $X$ with metric $d$ such that there is a countable dense subset $C = (c_0, c_1, \dots)$ of $X$ that makes the following two relations on $\N^4$ computable:

$$P(i,j,k,m) \iff d(c_i,c_j) \leq \frac{m}{k+1},\quad Q(i,j,k,m) \iff d(c_i,c_j) < \frac{m}{k+1}.$$
