= Descriptive set theory =

Subfield of mathematical logic

In mathematics, descriptive set theory is the study of certain classes of subsets of the real line and other Polish spaces satisfying some sort of definability criterion. As well as being one of the primary areas of research in topology and set theory, it has applications to other areas of mathematics such as functional analysis, ergodic theory, the study of operator algebras and group actions, and mathematical logic.

== Polish spaces ==
Descriptive set theory begins with the study of Polish spaces and their Borel sets.

A Polish space is a second-countable topological space that is metrizable with a complete metric. Heuristically, it is a complete, separable metric space whose metric has been "forgotten". Examples include the real line, as well as the Cantor space $2^\N$, the Baire space $\N^\N$, and the Hilbert cube $[0,1]^\N$, all equipped with the product topology.

=== Universality properties ===
The class of Polish spaces has several universality properties, which show that there is no loss of generality in considering Polish spaces of certain restricted forms. Notably,

- every Polish space is homeomorphic to a G_{δ} subspace of the Hilbert cube, and every $G_\delta$ subspace of the Hilbert cube is Polish;
- every Polish space is obtained as a continuous image of the Baire space; in fact, every Polish space is the image of a continuous bijection defined on a closed subset of the Baire space;
- similarly, every compact Polish space is a continuous image of the Cantor space.

Because of these properties, and because the Baire space $\N^\N$ has the convenient property that it is homeomorphic to $(\N^\N)^\N$, many results in descriptive set theory are proved in the context of the Baire space alone.

== Borel sets ==
The class of Borel sets of a topological space X consists of all sets in the smallest σ-algebra containing the open sets of X. This means that the Borel sets of X are the smallest collection of sets such that:

- Every open subset of X is a Borel set.
- If A is a Borel set, so is $X \setminus A$. That is, the class of Borel sets are closed under complementation.
- If A_{n} is a Borel set for each natural number n, then the union $\bigcup A_n$ is a Borel set. That is, the Borel sets are closed under countable unions.

A fundamental result shows that any two uncountable Polish spaces X and Y are Borel isomorphic: there is a bijection from X to Y such that the preimage of any Borel set is Borel, and the image of any Borel set is Borel. This gives additional justification to the practice of restricting attention to Baire space and Cantor space, since these and any other Polish spaces are all isomorphic at the level of Borel sets.

=== Borel hierarchy ===
Each Borel set of a Polish space is classified in the Borel hierarchy based on how many times the operations of countable union and complementation must be used to obtain the set, beginning from open sets. The classification is in terms of countable ordinal numbers. For each nonzero countable ordinal α there are classes $\mathbf{\Sigma}^0_\alpha$, $\mathbf{\Pi}^0_\alpha$, and $\mathbf{\Delta}^0_\alpha$.

- Every open set is declared to be $\mathbf{\Sigma}^0_1$.
- A set is declared to be $\mathbf{\Pi}^0_\alpha$ if and only if its complement is $\mathbf{\Sigma}^0_\alpha$.
- A set A is declared to be $\mathbf{\Sigma}^0_\delta$, δ > 1, if there is a sequence ⟨ A_{i} ⟩ of sets, each of which is $\mathbf{\Pi}^0_{\lambda(i)}$ for some λ(i) < δ, such that $A = \bigcup A_i$.
- A set is $\mathbf{\Delta}^0_\alpha$ if and only if it is both $\mathbf{\Sigma}^0_\alpha$ and $\mathbf{\Pi}^0_\alpha$.

A theorem shows that any set that is $\mathbf{\Sigma}^0_\alpha$ or $\mathbf{\Pi}^0_\alpha$ is $\mathbf{\Delta}^0_{\alpha + 1}$, and any $\mathbf{\Delta}^0_\beta$ set is both $\mathbf{\Sigma}^0_\alpha$ and $\mathbf{\Pi}^0_\alpha$ for all α > β. Thus the hierarchy has the following structure, where arrows indicate inclusion.

$$\begin{matrix}
& & \mathbf{\Sigma}^0_1 & & & & \mathbf{\Sigma}^0_2 & & \cdots \\
& \nearrow & & \searrow & & \nearrow \\
\mathbf{\Delta}^0_1 & & & & \mathbf{\Delta}^0_2 & & & & \cdots \\
& \searrow & & \nearrow & & \searrow \\
& & \mathbf{\Pi}^0_1 & & & & \mathbf{\Pi}^0_2 & & \cdots
\end{matrix}\begin{matrix}
& &  \mathbf{\Sigma}^0_\alpha & & & \cdots \\
& \nearrow & & \searrow \\
\quad \mathbf{\Delta}^0_\alpha &  & & & \mathbf{\Delta}^0_{\alpha + 1} & \cdots \\
& \searrow & & \nearrow \\
& & \mathbf{\Pi}^0_\alpha & & & \cdots
\end{matrix}$$

=== Regularity properties of Borel sets ===
Classical descriptive set theory includes the study of regularity properties of Borel sets. For example, all Borel sets of a Polish space have the property of Baire and the perfect set property. Modern descriptive set theory includes the study of the ways in which these results generalize, or fail to generalize, to other classes of subsets of Polish spaces.

== Analytic and coanalytic sets ==
Just beyond the Borel sets in complexity are the analytic sets and coanalytic sets. A subset of a Polish space X is analytic if it is the continuous image of a Borel subset of some other Polish space. Although any continuous preimage of a Borel set is Borel, not all analytic sets are Borel sets. A set is coanalytic if its complement is analytic.

== Projective sets and Wadge degrees ==
Many questions in descriptive set theory ultimately depend upon set-theoretic considerations and the properties of ordinal and cardinal numbers. This phenomenon is particularly apparent in the projective sets. These are defined via the projective hierarchy on a Polish space X:

- A set is declared to be $\mathbf{\Sigma}^1_1$ if it is analytic.
- A set is $\mathbf{\Pi}^1_1$ if it is coanalytic.
- A set A is $\mathbf{\Sigma}^1_{n+1}$ if there is a $\mathbf{\Pi}^1_n$ subset B of $X \times X$ such that A is the projection of B to the first coordinate.
- A set A is $\mathbf{\Pi}^1_{n+1}$ if there is a $\mathbf{\Sigma}^1_n$ subset B of $X \times X$ such that A is the projection of B to the first coordinate.
- A set is $\mathbf{\Delta}^1_{n}$ if it is both $\mathbf{\Pi}^1_n$ and $\mathbf{\Sigma}^1_n$ .

As with the Borel hierarchy, for each n, any $\mathbf{\Delta}^1_n$ set is both $\mathbf{\Sigma}^1_{n+1}$ and $\mathbf{\Pi}^1_{n+1}$.

The properties of the projective sets are not completely determined by ZFC. Under the assumption V = L, not all projective sets have the perfect set property or the property of Baire. However, under the assumption of projective determinacy, all projective sets have both the perfect set property and the property of Baire. This is related to the fact that ZFC proves Borel determinacy, but not projective determinacy.

There are also generic extensions of $L$ for any natural number $n>2$ in which $\mathcal P(\omega)\cap L$ consists of all the lightface $\Delta^1_n$ subsets of $\omega$.

More generally, the entire collection of sets of elements of a Polish space $X$ can be grouped into equivalence classes, known as Wadge degrees, that generalize the projective hierarchy. These degrees are ordered in the Wadge hierarchy. The axiom of determinacy implies that the Wadge hierarchy on any Polish space is well-founded and of length Θ, with structure extending the projective hierarchy.

== Borel equivalence relations ==
A contemporary area of research in descriptive set theory studies Borel equivalence relations. A Borel equivalence relation on a Polish space $X$ is a Borel subset of $X \times X$ that is an equivalence relation on $X$.

== Effective descriptive set theory ==
The area of effective descriptive set theory combines the methods of descriptive set theory with those of generalized recursion theory (especially hyperarithmetical theory). In particular, it focuses on lightface analogues of hierarchies of classical descriptive set theory. Thus the hyperarithmetic hierarchy is studied instead of the Borel hierarchy, and the analytical hierarchy instead of the projective hierarchy. This research is related to weaker versions of set theory such as Kripke–Platek set theory and second-order arithmetic.

=== Table ===
Pointclasses
Lightface		Boldface	
Σ^{0}_{0} = Π^{0}_{0} = Δ^{0}_{0} (sometimes the same as Δ^{0}_{1})		**Σ^{0}_{0}** = **Π^{0}_{0}** = **Δ^{0}_{0}** (if defined)	
Δ^{0}_{1} = recursive		**Δ^{0}_{1}** = clopen	
Σ^{0}_{1} = recursively enumerable	Π^{0}_{1} = co-recursively enumerable	**Σ^{0}_{1}** = G = open	**Π^{0}_{1}** = F = closed
Δ^{0}_{2}		**Δ^{0}_{2}**	
Σ^{0}_{2}	Π^{0}_{2}	**Σ^{0}_{2}** = F_{σ}	**Π^{0}_{2}** = G_{δ}
Δ^{0}_{3}		**Δ^{0}_{3}**	
Σ^{0}_{3}	Π^{0}_{3}	**Σ^{0}_{3}** = G_{δσ}	**Π^{0}_{3}** = F_{σδ}
⋮		⋮	
Σ^{0}_{<ω} = Π^{0}_{<ω} = Δ^{0}_{<ω} = Σ^{1}_{0} = Π^{1}_{0} = Δ^{1}_{0} = arithmetical		**Σ^{0}_{<ω}** = **Π^{0}_{<ω}** = **Δ^{0}_{<ω}** = **Σ^{1}_{0}** = **Π^{1}_{0}** = **Δ^{1}_{0}** = boldface arithmetical	
⋮		⋮	
Δ^{0}_{α} (α recursive)		**Δ^{0}_{α}** (α countable)	
Σ^{0}_{α}	Π^{0}_{α}	**Σ^{0}_{α}**	**Π^{0}_{α}**
⋮		⋮	
Σ^{0}_{ω^{CK}_{1}} = Π^{0}_{ω^{CK}_{1}} = Δ^{0}_{ω^{CK}_{1}} = Δ^{1}_{1} = hyperarithmetical		**Σ^{0}_{ω_{1}}** = **Π^{0}_{ω_{1}}** = **Δ^{0}_{ω_{1}}** = **Δ^{1}_{1}** = **B** = Borel	
Σ^{1}_{1} = lightface analytic	Π^{1}_{1} = lightface coanalytic	**Σ^{1}_{1}** = A = analytic	**Π^{1}_{1}** = CA = coanalytic
Δ^{1}_{2}		**Δ^{1}_{2}**	
Σ^{1}_{2}	Π^{1}_{2}	**Σ^{1}_{2}** = PCA	**Π^{1}_{2}** = CPCA
Δ^{1}_{3}		**Δ^{1}_{3}**	
Σ^{1}_{3}	Π^{1}_{3}	**Σ^{1}_{3}** = PCPCA	**Π^{1}_{3}** = CPCPCA
⋮		⋮	
Σ^{1}_{<ω} = Π^{1}_{<ω} = Δ^{1}_{<ω} = Σ^{2}_{0} = Π^{2}_{0} = Δ^{2}_{0} = analytical		**Σ^{1}_{<ω}** = **Π^{1}_{<ω}** = **Δ^{1}_{<ω}** = **Σ^{2}_{0}** = **Π^{2}_{0}** = **Δ^{2}_{0}** = **P** = projective	
⋮		⋮	

== See also ==
- Pointclass
- Prewellordering
- Scale property
