= Door space =

In mathematics, specifically in the field of topology, a topological space is said to be a door space if every subset is open or closed (or both). The term comes from the introductory topology mnemonic that "a subset is not like a door: it can be open, closed, both, or neither".

== Properties and examples ==
Every door space is T_{0} (because if $x$ and $y$ are two topologically indistinguishable points, the singleton $\{x\}$ is neither open nor closed).

Every subspace of a door space is a door space. So is every quotient of a door space.

Every topology finer than a door topology on a set $X$ is also a door topology.

Every discrete space is a door space. These are the spaces without accumulation point, that is, whose every point is an isolated point.

Every space $X$ with exactly one accumulation point (and all the other point isolated) is a door space (since subsets consisting only of isolated points are open, and subsets containing the accumulation point are closed). Some examples are: (1) the one-point compactification of a discrete space (also called Fort space), where the point at infinity is the accumulation point; (2) a space with the excluded point topology, where the "excluded point" is the accumulation point.

Every Hausdorff door space is either discrete or has exactly one accumulation point. (To see this, if $X$ is a space with distinct accumulation points $x$ and $y$ having respective disjoint neighbourhoods $U$ and $V,$ the set $(U\setminus\{x\})\cup\{y\}$ is neither closed nor open in $X.$)

An example of door space with more than one accumulation point is given by the particular point topology on a set $X$ with at least three points. The open sets are the subsets containing a particular point $p\in X,$ together with the empty set. The point $p$ is an isolated point and all the other points are accumulation points. (This is a door space since every set containing $p$ is open and every set not containing $p$ is closed.) Another example would be the topological sum of a space with the particular point topology and a discrete space.

Door spaces $(X,\tau)$ with no isolated point are exactly those with a topology of the form $\tau=\mathcal U \cup \{\emptyset\}$ for some free ultrafilter $\mathcal U$ on $X.$ Such spaces are necessarily infinite.

There are exactly three types of connected door spaces $(X,\tau)$:

- a space with the excluded point topology;
- a space with the included point topology;
- a space with topology $\tau$ such that $\tau\setminus\{\emptyset\}$ is a free ultrafilter on $X.$

== See also ==
- Clopen set – Subset which is both open and closed
