= Suslin operation =

In mathematics, the Suslin operation 𝓐 is an operation that constructs a set from a collection of sets indexed by finite sequences of positive integers. The Suslin operation was introduced by Alexandrov (1916) and Suslin (1917). In Russia it is sometimes called the A-operation after Alexandrov. It is usually denoted by the symbol 𝓐 (a calligraphic capital letter A).

== Definitions ==
A Suslin scheme is a family $P = \{ P_s: s \in \omega^{<\omega} \}$ of subsets of a set $X$ indexed by finite sequences of non-negative integers. The Suslin operation applied to this scheme produces the set

$$\mathcal A P = \bigcup_{x \in {\omega ^ \omega}} \bigcap_{n \in \omega} P_{x \upharpoonright n}$$

Alternatively, suppose we have a Suslin scheme, in other words a function $M$ from finite sequences of positive integers $n_1,\dots, n_k$ to sets $M_{n_1,..., n_k}$. The result of the Suslin operation is the set

$$\mathcal A(M) = \bigcup \left(M_{n_1} \cap M_{n_1, n_2} \cap M_{n_1, n_2, n_3} \cap  \dots \right)$$

where the union is taken over all infinite sequences $n_1,\dots, n_k, \dots$

If $M$ is a family of subsets of a set $X$, then $\mathcal A(M)$ is the family of subsets of $X$ obtained by applying the Suslin operation $\mathcal A$ to all collections as above where all the sets $M_{n_1,..., n_k}$ are in $M$. The Suslin operation on collections of subsets of $X$ has the property that $\mathcal A(\mathcal A(M)) = \mathcal A(M)$. The family $\mathcal A(M)$ is closed under taking countable intersections and—if $X\in M$—countable unions, but is not in general closed under taking complements.

If $M$ is the family of closed subsets of a topological space, then the elements of $\mathcal A(M)$ are called Suslin sets, or analytic sets if the space is a Polish space.

== Example ==
For each finite sequence $s \in \omega^n$, let $N_s = \{ x \in \omega^{\omega}: x \upharpoonright n = s\}$ be the infinite sequences that extend $s$. This is a clopen subset of $\omega^\omega$. If $X$ is a Polish space and $f: \omega^{\omega} \to X$ is a continuous function, let $P_s = \overline{f[N_s]}$. Then $P = \{ P_s: s \in \omega^{<\omega} \}$ is a Suslin scheme consisting of closed subsets of $X$ and $\mathcal AP = f[\omega^{\omega}]$.
