= Borel isomorphism =

In mathematics, a Borel isomorphism is a measurable bijective function between two standard Borel spaces. By Souslin's theorem in standard Borel spaces (which says that a set that is both analytic and coanalytic is necessarily Borel), the inverse of any such measurable bijective function is also measurable. Borel isomorphisms are closed under composition and under taking of inverses. The set of Borel isomorphisms from a space to itself clearly forms a group under composition. Borel isomorphisms on standard Borel spaces are analogous to homeomorphisms on topological spaces: both are bijective and closed under composition, and a homeomorphism and its inverse are both continuous, instead of both being only Borel measurable.

== Borel space ==
A measurable space that is Borel isomorphic to a measurable subset of the real numbers is called a Borel space.

== See also ==
- Federer–Morse theorem
