= Suslin cardinal =

Transfinite cardinal number at which one obtains new Suslin sets

In mathematics, a cardinal λ < Θ is a Suslin cardinal if there exists a set P ⊂ 2^{ω} such that P is λ-Suslin but P is not λ'-Suslin for any λ' < λ. It is named after the Russian mathematician Mikhail Yakovlevich Suslin (1894–1919).

== See also ==
- Suslin representation
- Suslin line
- AD+
