= Strictly determined game =

Game with a stable optimal strategy

In game theory, a strictly determined game is a game where the optimal strategy for each player does not depend on the strategy chosen by the other players. In such a game, a single outcome represents the most rational choice for both players, meaning neither can improve their result by unilaterally changing their move. This stable outcome is called a saddlepoint.

Many common games are strictly determined. For example, in tic-tac-toe, a game between two perfect players will always end in a draw. Both players know this, and any move away from optimal play will not improve their outcome if the other player continues to play optimally. Other finite combinatorial games, like chess, draughts, and go, are also strictly determined.

== Formal definition ==
A strictly determined game is a two-player zero-sum game that has at least one Nash equilibrium with both players using pure strategies. The value of such a game, v, is known as the value of the game. It represents the minimum payoff guaranteed to the maximizing player and the maximum loss the minimizing player must accept, regardless of their opponent's strategy. The value of a strictly determined game is equal to the value of the equilibrium outcome.

== Notes ==
The study and classification of strictly determined games is distinct from the study of Determinacy, which is a subfield of set theory.

== See also ==
- Solved game
