= Suslin homology =

Abstract homology theory

In mathematics, the Suslin homology is a homology theory attached to algebraic varieties. It was proposed by Andrei Suslin in 1987, and developed by Suslin and Voevodsky (1996). It is sometimes called singular homology as it is analogous to the singular homology of topological spaces.

By definition, given an abelian group A and a scheme X of finite type over a field k, the theory is given by the Tor group

$$H_i(X, A) = \operatorname{Tor}_i^\mathbb{Z}(C, A)$$

where C is a free graded abelian group whose degree n part is generated by integral subschemes of $\triangle^n \times X$, where $\triangle^n$ is an n-simplex, that are finite and surjective over $\triangle^n$.
