= Suslin representation =

In mathematics, a Suslin representation of a set of reals (more precisely, elements of Baire space) is a tree whose projection is that set of reals. More generally, a subset A of κ^{ω} is λ-Suslin if there is a tree T on κ × λ such that A = p[T].

By a tree on κ × λ we mean a subset T ⊆ ⋃_{n<ω}(κ^{n} × λ^{n}) closed under initial segments, and p[T] = { f∈κ^{ω} | ∃g∈λ^{ω} : (f,g) ∈ [T] } is the projection of T, where [T] = { (f, g )∈κ^{ω} × λ^{ω} | ∀n < ω : (f |n, g |n) ∈ T } is the set of branches through T.

Since [T] is a closed set for the product topology on κ^{ω} × λ^{ω} where κ and λ are equipped with the discrete topology (and all closed sets in κ^{ω} × λ^{ω} come in this way from some tree on κ × λ), λ-Suslin subsets of κ^{ω} are projections of closed subsets in κ^{ω} × λ^{ω}.

When one talks of Suslin sets without specifying the space, then one usually means Suslin subsets of R, which descriptive set theorists usually take to be the set ω^{ω}.

== See also ==
- Suslin cardinal
- Suslin operation
