= Analytic set =

Concept in descriptive set theory (mathematics)

In the mathematical field of descriptive set theory, a subset of a Polish space $X$ is an analytic set if it is a continuous image of a Polish space. These sets were first defined by Luzin (1917) and his student Souslin (1917).

== Definition ==
There are several equivalent definitions of analytic set. The following conditions on a subspace A of a Polish space X are equivalent:

- A is analytic.
- A is empty or a continuous image of the Baire space ω^{ω}.
- A is a Suslin space, in other words A is the image of a Polish space under a continuous mapping.
- A is the continuous image of a Borel set in a Polish space.
- A is a Suslin set, the image of the Suslin operation.
- There is a Polish space $Y$ and a Borel set $B\subseteq X\times Y$ such that $A$ is the projection of $B$ onto $X$; that is,

$$A=\{x\in X|(\exists y\in Y)\langle x,y \rangle\in B\}.$$

- A is the projection of a closed set in the cartesian product of X with the Baire space.
- A is the projection of a G_{δ} set in the cartesian product of X with the Cantor space 2^{ω}.

An alternative characterization, in the specific, important, case that $X$ is Baire space ω^{ω}, is that the analytic sets are precisely the projections of trees on $\omega\times\omega$. Similarly, the analytic subsets of Cantor space 2^{ω} are precisely the projections of trees on $2\times\omega$.

== Properties ==
Analytic subsets of Polish spaces are closed under countable unions and intersections, continuous images, and inverse images. The complement of an analytic set need not be analytic. Suslin proved that if the complement of an analytic set is analytic then the set is Borel. (Conversely any Borel set is analytic and Borel sets are closed under complements.) Luzin proved more generally that any two disjoint analytic sets are separated by a Borel set: in other words there is a Borel set including one and disjoint from the other. This is sometimes called the "Luzin separability principle" (though it was implicit in the proof of Suslin's theorem).

Analytic sets are always Lebesgue measurable (indeed, universally measurable) and have the property of Baire and the perfect set property.

== Examples ==
When $A$ is a set of natural numbers, refer to the set $\{x-y\mid y\leq x\land x,y\in A\}$ as the difference set of $A$. The set of difference sets of natural numbers is an analytic set, and is complete for analytic sets.

== Projective hierarchy ==
Analytic sets are also called $\boldsymbol{\Sigma}^1_1$ (see projective hierarchy). Note that the bold font in this symbol is not the Wikipedia convention, but rather is used distinctively from its lightface counterpart $\Sigma^1_1$ (see analytical hierarchy). The complements of analytic sets are called coanalytic sets, and the set of coanalytic sets is denoted by $\boldsymbol{\Pi}^1_1$. The intersection $\boldsymbol{\Delta}^1_1=\boldsymbol{\Sigma}^1_1\cap \boldsymbol{\Pi}^1_1$ is the set of Borel sets.

== See also ==
- Projection (measure theory)
