= Coanalytic set =

In descriptive set theory, a coanalytic set is a set (typically a subset of a Polish space) that is the complement of an analytic set. In the projective hierarchy, coanalytic sets correspond to $\mathbf{\Pi}^1_1$ sets.
