= Borel set =

Class of mathematical sets

In mathematics, the Borel sets of a topological space are a particular class of "well-behaved" subsets of that space. For example, whereas an arbitrary subset of the real numbers might fail to be Lebesgue measurable, every Borel set of reals is universally measurable. Which sets are Borel can be specified in a number of equivalent ways. Borel sets are named after Émile Borel.

The most usual definition goes through the notion of a σ-algebra, which is a collection of subsets of a topological space $X$ that contains both the empty set and the entire set $X$, and is closed under countable union and complement.

Then we can define the Borel σ-algebra over $X$ to be the smallest σ-algebra containing all open sets of $X$. (Note: Equivalently, all closed sets.) A Borel subset of $X$ is then simply an element of this σ-algebra.

Borel sets are important in measure theory, since any measure defined on the open sets of a space, or on the closed sets of a space, must also be defined on all Borel sets of that space. Any measure defined on the Borel sets is called a Borel measure. Borel sets and the associated Borel hierarchy also play a fundamental role in descriptive set theory.

In some contexts, Borel sets are defined to be generated by the compact sets of the topological space, rather than the open sets. The two definitions are equivalent for many well-behaved spaces, including all Hausdorff σ-compact spaces, but can be different in more pathological spaces.

== Generating the Borel algebra ==
In the case that $X$ is a metric space, the Borel algebra in the first sense may be described generatively as follows.

For a collection $T$ of subsets of $X$ (that is, for any subset of the power set $\mathcal P$$(X)$ of $X$), let

- $T_\sigma$ be all countable unions of elements of $T$
- $T_\delta$ be all countable intersections of elements of $T$
- $T_{\delta\sigma} = (T_\delta)_\sigma.$

Now define by transfinite induction a sequence $G^m$, where $m$ is an ordinal number, in the following manner:

- For the base case of the definition, let $G^0$ be the collection of open subsets of $X$.
- If $i$ is not a limit ordinal, then $i$ has an immediately preceding ordinal $i-1$. Let
  $$G^i = [G^{i-1}]_{\delta \sigma}.$$
- If $i$ is a limit ordinal, set
  $$G^i = \bigcup_{j < i} G^j.$$

The claim is that the Borel algebra is $G^{\omega_1}$, where ${\omega_1}$ is the first uncountable ordinal number. That is, the Borel algebra can be generated from the class of open sets by iterating the operation
$$G \mapsto G_{\delta \sigma}$$
to the first uncountable ordinal.

To prove this claim, any open set in a metric space is the union of an increasing sequence of closed sets. In particular, complementation of sets maps $G^m$ into itself for any limit ordinal $m$; moreover if $m$ is an uncountable limit ordinal, $G^m$ is closed under countable unions.

For each Borel set $B$, there is some countable ordinal $\alpha_B$ such that $B$ can be obtained by iterating the operation over $\alpha_B$. However, as $B$ varies over all Borel sets, $\alpha_B$ will vary over all the countable ordinals, and thus the first ordinal at which all the Borel sets are obtained is $\omega_1$, the first uncountable ordinal.

The resulting sequence of sets is termed the Borel hierarchy.

=== Example ===
An important example, especially in the theory of probability, is the Borel algebra on the set of real numbers. It is the algebra on which the Borel measure is defined. Given a real random variable defined on a probability space, its probability distribution is by definition also a measure on the Borel algebra.

The Borel algebra on the reals is the smallest σ-algebra on $\mathbb R$ that contains all the intervals.

In the construction by transfinite induction, it can be shown that, in each step, the number of sets is, at most, the cardinality of the continuum. So, the total number of Borel sets is less than or equal to
$$\aleph_1 \cdot 2 ^ {\aleph_0}\, = 2^{\aleph_0}.$$

In fact, the cardinality of the collection of Borel sets is equal to that of the continuum (compare to the number of Lebesgue measurable sets that exist, which is strictly larger and equal to $2^{2^{\aleph_0}}$).

== Standard Borel spaces and Kuratowski theorems ==
Let $X$ be a topological space. The Borel space associated to $X$ is the pair $(X,\mathcal B)$, where $\mathcal B$ is the σ-algebra of Borel sets of $X$.

George Mackey defined a Borel space somewhat differently, writing that it is "a set together with a distinguished σ-field of subsets called its Borel sets." However, modern usage is to call the distinguished sub-algebra the measurable sets and such spaces measurable spaces. The reason for this distinction is that the Borel sets are the σ-algebra generated by open sets (of a topological space), whereas Mackey's definition refers to a set equipped with an arbitrary σ-algebra. There exist measurable spaces that are not Borel spaces, for any choice of topology on the underlying space.

Measurable spaces form a category in which the morphisms are measurable functions between measurable spaces. A function $f:X \rightarrow Y$ is measurable if it pulls back measurable sets, i.e., for all measurable sets $B$ in $Y$, the set $f^{-1}(B)$ is measurable in $X$.

Theorem. Let $X$ be a Polish space, that is, a topological space such that there is a metric $d$ on $X$ that defines the topology of $X$ and that makes $X$ a complete separable metric space. Then $X$ as a Borel space is isomorphic to one of

1. $\mathbb R$,
2. $\mathbb Z$,
3. a finite space.

(This result is reminiscent of Maharam's theorem.)

Considered as Borel spaces, the real line $\mathbb R$, the union of $\mathbb R$ with a countable set, and $\mathbb R^n$ are isomorphic.

A standard Borel space is the Borel space associated to a Polish space. A standard Borel space is characterized up to isomorphism by its cardinality, and any uncountable standard Borel space has the cardinality of the continuum.

For subsets of Polish spaces, Borel sets can be characterized as those sets that are the ranges of continuous injective maps defined on Polish spaces. Note however, that the range of a continuous noninjective map may fail to be Borel. See analytic set.

Every probability measure on a standard Borel space turns it into a standard probability space.

== Non-Borel sets ==
An example of a subset of the reals that is non-Borel, due to Lusin, is described below. In contrast, an example of a non-measurable set cannot be exhibited, although the existence of such a set is implied, for example, by the axiom of choice.

Every irrational number has a unique representation by an infinite simple continued fraction

$$x = a_0 + \cfrac{1}{a_1 + \cfrac{1}{a_2 + \cfrac{1}{a_3 + \cfrac{1}{\ddots\,}}}}$$

where $a_0$ is some integer and all the other numbers $a_k$ are positive integers. Let $A$ be the set of all irrational numbers that correspond to sequences $(a_0,a_1,\dots)$ with the following property: there exists an infinite subsequence $(a_{k_0},a_{k_1},\dots)$ such that each element is a divisor of the next element. This set $A$ is not Borel. However, it is analytic (all Borel sets are also analytic), and complete in the class of analytic sets.

It's important to note, that while Zermelo–Fraenkel axioms (ZF) are sufficient to formalize the construction of $A$, it cannot be proven in ZF alone that $A$ is non-Borel. In fact, it is consistent with ZF that $\mathbb{R}$ is a countable union of countable sets, so that any subset of $\mathbb{R}$ is a Borel set.

Another non-Borel set is an inverse image $f^{-1}[0]$ of an infinite parity function $f\colon \{0, 1\}^{\omega} \to \{0, 1\}$. However, this is a proof of existence (via the axiom of choice), not an explicit example.

== Alternative non-equivalent definitions ==
According to Paul Halmos, a subset of a locally compact Hausdorff topological space is called a Borel set if it belongs to the smallest σ-ring containing all compact sets.

Norberg and Vervaat redefine the Borel algebra of a topological space $X$ as the $\sigma$-algebra generated by its open subsets and its compact saturated subsets. This definition is well-suited for applications in the case where $X$ is not Hausdorff. It coincides with the usual definition if $X$ is second countable or if every compact saturated subset is closed (which is the case in particular if $X$ is Hausdorff).

== See also ==
- Borel hierarchy – Mathematical logic hierarchy
- Borel isomorphism
- Baire set
- Cylindrical σ-algebra
- Descriptive set theory – Subfield of mathematical logic
- Polish space – Concept in topology
