= Clopen set =

Subset which is both open and closed

In topology, a clopen set (a portmanteau of closed-open set) in a topological space is a set which is both open and closed. That this is possible may seem counterintuitive, as the common meanings of open and closed are antonyms, but their mathematical definitions are not mutually exclusive. A set is closed if its complement is open, which leaves the possibility of an open set whose complement is also open, making both sets both open and closed, and therefore clopen. As described by topologist James Munkres, unlike a door, "a set can be open, or closed, or both, or neither!" emphasizing that the meaning of "open"/"closed" for doors is unrelated to their meaning for sets (and so the open/closed door dichotomy does not transfer to open/closed sets). This contrast to doors gave the class of topological spaces known as "door spaces" their name.

== Examples ==
In any topological space $X,$ the empty set and the whole space $X$ are both clopen.

Now consider the space $X$ which consists of the union of the two open intervals $(0, 1)$ and $(2, 3)$ of $\R.$ The topology on $X$ is inherited as the subspace topology from the ordinary topology on the real line $\R.$ In $X,$ the set $(0, 1)$ is clopen, as is the set $(2, 3).$ This is a quite typical example: whenever a space is made up of a finite number of disjoint connected components in this way, the components will be clopen.

Now let $X$ be an infinite set under the discrete metric – that is, two points $p, q \in X$ have distance 1 if they're not the same point, and 0 otherwise. Under the resulting metric space, any singleton set is open; hence any set, being the union of single points, is open. Since any set is open, the complement of any set is open too, and therefore any set is closed. So, all sets in this metric space are clopen.

As a less trivial example, consider the space $\Q$ of all rational numbers with their ordinary topology, and the set $A$ of all positive rational numbers whose square is bigger than 2. Using the fact that $\sqrt 2$ is not in $\Q,$ one can show quite easily that $A$ is a clopen subset of $\Q.$ ($A$ is not a clopen subset of the real line $\R$; it is neither open nor closed in $\R.$)

== Properties ==
- A topological space $X$ is connected if and only if the only clopen sets are the empty set and $X$ itself.
- A set is clopen if and only if its boundary is empty.
- Any clopen subset of a space $X$ is a union of (possibly infinitely many) connected components of $X$.
- If all connected components of $X$ are open (for instance, if $X$ has only finitely many components, or if $X$ is locally connected), then a set is clopen in $X$ if and only if it is a union of connected components.
- A topological space $X$ is discrete if and only if all of its subsets are clopen.
- Using the union and intersection as operations, the clopen subsets of a given topological space $X$ form a Boolean algebra. Every Boolean algebra can be obtained in this way from a suitable topological space: see Stone's representation theorem for Boolean algebras.

== See also ==
- List of set identities and relations – Equalities for combinations of sets
