= Polish space =

Concept in topology

In mathematics, a Polish space is a separable, completely metrizable topological space; i.e., a space homeomorphic to a complete metric space that has a countable dense subset. Polish spaces are so named because they were first extensively studied by Polish topologists and logicians, such as Sierpiński, Kuratowski, Tarski and others.

Polish spaces are mostly studied today because they are the primary setting for descriptive set theory, including the study of Borel equivalence relations. Polish spaces are also a convenient setting for more advanced measure theory, in particular in probability theory.

Common examples of Polish spaces are the real line, the Baire space, Cantor spaces and separable Banach spaces. Additionally, some spaces that are not complete metric spaces in the usual metric may be Polish: for example, open intervals are Polish.

Any two uncountable Polish spaces are Borel isomorphic. In particular, every uncountable Polish space has the cardinality of the continuum.

Lusin spaces, Suslin spaces, and Radon spaces are generalizations of Polish spaces.

== Properties ==
1. Every Polish space is second countable (by virtue of being separable and metrizable).
2. A subspace $Q$ of a Polish space $P$ is Polish (under the induced topology) if and only if $Q$ is the intersection of a sequence of open subsets of $P$ (i.e., $Q$ is a $G_\delta$-set).
3. Cantor–Bendixson theorem: if $X$ is Polish then any closed subset of $X$ can be written as the disjoint union of a perfect set and a countable set. Moreover, if $X$ is uncountable, it can be written as the disjoint union of a perfect set and a countable open set.
4. Every Polish space is homeomorphic to a $G_\delta$-subset of the Hilbert cube $[0,1]^\N$.

The following spaces are Polish:

- closed subsets of a Polish space,
- open subsets of a Polish space,
- products and disjoint unions of countable families of Polish spaces,
- locally compact spaces that are metrizable and countable at infinity,
- countable intersections of Polish subspaces of a Hausdorff topological space,
- the set of irrational numbers with the topology induced by the standard topology of the real line.

== Characterization ==
There are many known conditions for a second-countable topological space to be metrizable, such as Urysohn's metrization theorem. The problem of determining whether a metrizable space is completely metrizable is more difficult. Topological spaces such as the open unit interval $(0,1)$ can be given both complete metrics and incomplete metrics generating their topology.

There is a characterization of complete separable metric spaces in terms of a game known as the strong Choquet game. A separable metric space is completely metrizable if and only if the second player has a winning strategy in this game.

A second characterization follows from Alexandrov's theorem, which states that a separable metric space is completely metrizable if and only if it is a $G_\delta$ subset of its completion in the original metric.

== Polish metric spaces ==
Although Polish spaces are metrizable, they are not in and of themselves metric spaces; each Polish space admits many complete metrics giving rise to the same topology, but no one of these is singled out or distinguished. A Polish space with a distinguished complete metric is called a Polish metric space. An alternative approach, equivalent to the one given here, is first to define "Polish metric space" to mean "complete separable metric space", and then to define a "Polish space" as the topological space obtained from a Polish metric space by forgetting the metric.

== Generalizations ==
=== Lusin spaces ===
A Hausdorff topological space is a Lusin space (named after Nikolai Lusin) if some stronger topology makes it into a Polish space.

There are many ways to form Lusin spaces. In particular:

- Every Polish space is a Lusin space.
- A subspace of a Lusin space is a Lusin space if and only if it is a Borel set.
- Any countable union or intersection of Lusin subspaces of a Hausdorff space is a Lusin space.
- The product of a countable number of Lusin spaces is a Lusin space.
- The disjoint union of a countable number of Lusin spaces is a Lusin space.

=== Suslin spaces ===
A Hausdorff topological space is a Suslin space (named after Mikhail Suslin) if it is the image of a Polish space under a continuous mapping. Thus, every Lusin space is Suslin. A subset of a Polish space is a Suslin space if and only if it is a Suslin set (an image of the Suslin operation).

The following are Suslin spaces:

- closed or open subsets of a Suslin space,
- countable products and disjoint unions of Suslin spaces,
- countable intersections or countable unions of Suslin subspaces of a Hausdorff topological space,
- continuous images of Suslin spaces,
- Borel subsets of a Suslin space.

Notably, every Suslin space is separable.

=== Radon spaces ===
A Radon space (named after Johann Radon) is a topological space on which every Borel probability measure is inner regular. Since a probability measure is globally finite, and hence locally finite, every probability measure on a Radon space is also a Radon measure. In particular, a separable complete metric space is a Radon space.

Every Suslin space is a Radon space.

== Polish groups ==
A Polish group is a topological group that is also a Polish space; in other words, a group homeomorphic to a separable complete metric space. There are several classic results of Banach, Freudenthal and Kuratowski on homomorphisms between Polish groups. Firstly, if $G$ and $H$ are separable metric spaces with $G$ Polish, then any Borel homomorphism from $G$ to $H$ is continuous. Secondly, there is a version of the open mapping theorem or the closed graph theorem due to Kuratowski: a continuous surjective homomorphism of a Polish group onto another Polish group is an open mapping; a homomorphism between Polish groups is continuous if and only if its graph is closed. As a result, it is a remarkable fact about Polish groups that Baire-measurable mappings (i.e., for which the preimage of any open set has the property of Baire) that are homomorphisms between them are automatically continuous. The group of homeomorphisms of the Hilbert cube $[0,1]^\N$ is a universal Polish group, in the sense that every Polish group is isomorphic to a closed subgroup of it.

Examples of Polish groups are

- all finite dimensional Lie groups with a countable number of components,
- the unitary group of a separable Hilbert space (with the strong operator topology),
- the group of homeomorphisms of a compact metric space,
- the product of a countable number of Polish groups,
- the group of isometries of a separable complete metric space.

== See also ==
- Standard Borel space
