= List of mathematical logic topics =

This is a list of mathematical logic topics.

For traditional syllogistic logic, see the list of topics in logic. See also the list of computability and complexity topics for more theory of algorithms.

== Working foundations ==
- Peano axioms
  - Giuseppe Peano
- Mathematical induction
  - Structural induction
  - Recursive definition
- Naive set theory
  - Element (mathematics)
    - Ur-element
  - Singleton (mathematics)
  - Simple theorems in the algebra of sets
  - Algebra of sets
  - Power set
  - Empty set
  - Non-empty set
  - Empty function
- Universe (mathematics)
- Axiomatization
- Axiomatic system
  - Axiom schema
- Axiomatic method
- Formal system
- Mathematical proof
  - Direct proof
  - Reductio ad absurdum
  - Proof by exhaustion
  - Constructive proof
  - Nonconstructive proof
- Tautology
- Consistency proof
- Arithmetization of analysis
- Foundations of mathematics
- Formal language
- Principia Mathematica
- Hilbert's program
- Impredicative
- Definable real number
- Algebraic logic
  - Boolean algebra (logic)
- Dialectica space
- categorical logic

== Model theory ==
- Finite model theory
  - Descriptive complexity theory
  - Model checking
  - Trakhtenbrot's theorem
- Computable model theory
  - Tarski's exponential function problem
  - Undecidable problem
- Institutional model theory
  - Institution (computer science)
- Non-standard analysis
  - Non-standard calculus
  - Hyperinteger
  - Hyperreal number
  - Transfer principle
  - Overspill
  - Elementary Calculus: An Infinitesimal Approach
  - Criticism of non-standard analysis
  - Standard part function
- Set theory
  - Forcing (mathematics)
    - Boolean-valued model
- Kripke semantics
  - General frame
- Predicate logic
  - First-order logic
    - Infinitary logic
    - Many-sorted logic
  - Higher-order logic
    - Lindström quantifier
    - Second-order logic
- Soundness theorem
- Gödel's completeness theorem
  - Original proof of Gödel's completeness theorem
- Compactness theorem
- Löwenheim–Skolem theorem
  - Skolem's paradox
- Gödel's incompleteness theorems
- Structure (mathematical logic)
- Interpretation (logic)
- Substructure (mathematics)
- Elementary substructure
  - Skolem hull
- Non-standard model
- Atomic model (mathematical logic)
- Prime model
- Saturated model
- Existentially closed model
- Ultraproduct
- Age (model theory)
  - Amalgamation property
  - Hrushovski construction
- Potential isomorphism
- Theory (mathematical logic)
  - Complete theory
    - Vaught's test
  - Morley's categoricity theorem
    - Stability spectrum
      - Morley rank
      - Stable theory
        - Forking extension
        - Strongly minimal theory
        - Stable group
          - Tame group
    - o-minimal theory
    - Weakly o-minimal structure
    - C-minimal theory
    - Spectrum of a theory
      - Vaught conjecture
  - Model complete theory
  - List of first-order theories
  - Conservative extension
  - Elementary class
    - Pseudoelementary class
    - Strength (mathematical logic)
- Differentially closed field
- Exponential field
- Ax–Grothendieck theorem
- Ax–Kochen theorem
- Peano axioms
- Non-standard model of arithmetic
- First-order arithmetic
- Second-order arithmetic
- Presburger arithmetic
- Wilkie's theorem
- Functional predicate
- T-schema
- Back-and-forth method
- Barwise compactness theorem
- Skolemization
- Lindenbaum–Tarski algebra
- Löb's theorem
- Arithmetical set
- Definable set
- Ehrenfeucht–Fraïssé game
- Herbrand interpretation / Herbrand structure
- Imaginary element
- Indiscernibles
- Interpretation (model theory) / Interpretable structure
- Pregeometry (model theory)
- Quantifier elimination
- Reduct
- Signature (logic)
- Skolem normal form
- Type (model theory)
- Zariski geometry

== Set theory ==
- Algebra of sets
- Axiom of choice
  - Axiom of countable choice
  - Axiom of dependent choice
  - Zorn's lemma
- Boolean algebra (structure)
- Boolean-valued model
- Burali-Forti paradox
- Cantor's back-and-forth method
- Cantor's diagonal argument
- Cantor's first uncountability proof
- Cantor's theorem
- Cantor–Bernstein–Schroeder theorem
- Cardinality
  - Aleph number
    - Aleph-null
    - Aleph-one
  - Beth number
  - Cardinal number
  - Hartogs number
- Cartesian product
- Class (set theory)
- Complement (set theory)
- Complete Boolean algebra
- Continuum (set theory)
  - Suslin's problem
- Continuum hypothesis
- Countable set
- Descriptive set theory
  - Analytic set
  - Analytical hierarchy
  - Borel equivalence relation
  - Infinity-Borel set
  - Lightface analytic game
  - Perfect set property
  - Polish space
  - Prewellordering
  - Projective set
  - Property of Baire
  - Uniformization (set theory)
  - Universally measurable set
- Determinacy
  - AD+
  - Axiom of determinacy
  - Axiom of projective determinacy
  - Axiom of real determinacy
- Empty set
- Forcing (mathematics)
- Fuzzy set
- Internal set theory
- Intersection (set theory)
- L
- L(R)
- Large cardinal property
- Musical set theory
- Ordinal number
  - Infinite descending chain
  - Limit ordinal
  - Successor ordinal
  - Transfinite induction
    - ∈-induction
  - Well-founded set
  - Well-order
- Power set
- Russell's paradox
- Set theory
  - Alternative set theory
  - Axiomatic set theory
  - Kripke–Platek set theory with urelements
  - Morse–Kelley set theory
  - Naive set theory
  - New Foundations
  - Positive set theory
  - Zermelo–Fraenkel set theory
  - Zermelo set theory
- Set (mathematics)
- Simple theorems in the algebra of sets
- Subset
- Θ (set theory)
- Tree (descriptive set theory)
- Tree (set theory)
- Union (set theory)
- Von Neumann universe
- Zero sharp

== Descriptive set theory ==
- Analytical hierarchy

== Large cardinals ==
- Almost Ramsey cardinal
- Erdős cardinal
- Extendible cardinal
- Huge cardinal
- Hyper-Woodin cardinal
- Inaccessible cardinal
- Ineffable cardinal
- Mahlo cardinal
- Measurable cardinal
- N-huge cardinal
- Ramsey cardinal
- Rank-into-rank
- Remarkable cardinal
- Shelah cardinal
- Strong cardinal
- Strongly inaccessible cardinal
- Subtle cardinal
- Supercompact cardinal
- Superstrong cardinal
- Totally indescribable cardinal
- Weakly compact cardinal
- Weakly hyper-Woodin cardinal
- Weakly inaccessible cardinal
- Woodin cardinal
- Unfoldable cardinal

== Recursion theory ==
- Entscheidungsproblem
- Decision problem
- Decidability (logic)
- Church–Turing thesis
- Computable function
  - Algorithm
  - Recursion
  - Primitive recursive function
  - Mu operator
  - Ackermann function
  - Turing machine
  - Halting problem
  - Computability theory, computation
  - Herbrand Universe
  - Markov algorithm
  - Lambda calculus
    - Church–Rosser theorem
    - Calculus of constructions
  - Combinatory logic
  - Post correspondence problem
- Kleene's recursion theorem
- Recursively enumerable set
  - Recursively enumerable language
- Decidable language
- Undecidable language
- Rice's theorem
- Post's theorem
- Turing degree
- Effective results in number theory
- Diophantine set
- Matiyasevich's theorem
- Word problem for groups
- Arithmetical hierarchy
- Subrecursion theory
  - Presburger arithmetic
  - Computational complexity theory
  - Polynomial time
  - Exponential time
  - Complexity class
    - Complexity classes P and NP
    - Cook's theorem
    - List of complexity classes
    - Polynomial hierarchy
    - Exponential hierarchy
  - NP-complete
  - Time hierarchy theorem
  - Space hierarchy theorem
- Natural proof
- Hypercomputation
  - Oracle machine
- Rózsa Péter
- Alonzo Church
- Emil Post
- Alan Turing
- Jacques Herbrand
- Haskell Curry
- Stephen Cole Kleene
- Definable real number

== Proof theory ==
- Metamathematics
- Cut-elimination
- Tarski's undefinability theorem
- Diagonal lemma
- Provability logic
- Interpretability logic
- Sequent
- Sequent calculus
- Analytic proof
- Structural proof theory
- Self-verifying theories
- Substructural logics
  - Structural rule
    - Weakening
    - Contraction
  - Linear logic
    - Intuitionistic linear logic
    - Proof net
  - Affine logic
  - Strict logic
  - Relevant logic
- Proof-theoretic semantics
- Ludics
- System F
- Gerhard Gentzen
- Gentzen's consistency proof
- Reverse mathematics
- Nonfirstorderizability
- Interpretability
- Weak interpretability
- Cointerpretability
- Tolerant sequence
- Cotolerant sequence
- Deduction theorem
- Cirquent calculus

== Mathematical constructivism ==
- Nonconstructive proof
- Existence theorem
- Intuitionistic logic
- Intuitionistic type theory
- Type theory
- Lambda calculus
  - Church–Rosser theorem
- Simply typed lambda calculus
- Typed lambda calculus
- Curry–Howard isomorphism
- Calculus of constructions
- Constructivist analysis
- Lambda cube
- System F
- Introduction to topos theory
- LF (logical framework)
- Computability logic
- Computable measure theory
- Finitism
- Ultraintuitionism
- Luitzen Egbertus Jan Brouwer

== Modal logic ==
- Kripke semantics
- Sahlqvist formula
- Interior algebra

== Theorem provers ==
- First-order resolution
- Automated theorem proving
- ACL2 theorem prover
- E equational theorem prover
- Gandalf theorem prover
- HOL theorem prover
- Isabelle theorem prover
- LCF theorem prover
- Otter theorem prover
- Paradox theorem prover
- Vampire theorem prover
- Interactive proof system
- Mizar system
- QED project
- Rocq, formerly Coq

== Discovery systems ==
- Automated Mathematician
- Eurisko

== Historical ==
- Begriffsschrift
- Systems of Logic Based on Ordinals – Alan Turing's Ph.D. thesis

== See also ==
- Kurt Gödel
- Alfred Tarski
- Saharon Shelah
