= List of large cardinal properties =

This page includes a list of large cardinal properties in the mathematical field of set theory. It is arranged roughly in order of the consistency strength of the axiom asserting the existence of cardinals with the given property. Existence of a cardinal number κ of a given type implies the existence of cardinals of most of the types listed above that type, and for most listed cardinal descriptions φ of lesser consistency strength, V_{κ} satisfies "there is an unbounded class of cardinals satisfying φ".

The following table usually arranges cardinals in order of consistency strength, with size of the cardinal used as a tiebreaker. In a few cases (such as strongly compact cardinals) the exact consistency strength is not known and the table uses the current best guess.

- "Small" cardinals: 0, 1, 2, ..., $\aleph_0, \aleph_1$,..., $\kappa = \aleph_{\kappa}$, ... (see Aleph number); the height of the minimal transitive model of ZFC
- worldly cardinals
- weakly and strongly inaccessible, α-inaccessible, and hyper inaccessible cardinals
- weakly and strongly Mahlo, α-Mahlo, and hyper Mahlo cardinals.
- reflecting cardinals
- pseudo uplifting cardinals, uplifting cardinals
- weakly compact (= Π^{1}_{1}-indescribable), Π^{m}_{n}-indescribable, totally indescribable cardinals, ν-indescribable cardinals
- λ-unfoldable, unfoldable cardinals, λ-shrewd, shrewd cardinals, strongly uplifting cardinals (not clear how these relate to each other).
- ethereal cardinals, subtle cardinals
- almost ineffable, ineffable, n-ineffable, totally ineffable cardinals
- 1-iterable cardinal, remarkable cardinal, virtually extendible cardinal, γ-iterable cardinal for 2≤γ≤ω, virtually rank-into-rank cardinal, ω-Erdős cardinal
- λ-iterable cardinal, λ-Erdős cardinal (for limit ordinals ω2≤λ<ω_{1})
- Silver cardinal, 0^{#} (not a cardinal), ω_{1}-iterable cardinal, ω_{1}-Erdős cardinal
- almost Ramsey, Jónsson, Rowbottom, Ramsey, ineffably Ramsey, completely Ramsey, strongly Ramsey, super Ramsey cardinals, Magidor cardinals
- measurable cardinals, 0^{†}
- λ-strong, strong cardinals, tall cardinals
- Woodin, weakly hyper-Woodin, Shelah, hyper-Woodin cardinals
- superstrong cardinals (=1-superstrong; for n-superstrong for n≥2 see further down.)
- subcompact, strongly compact (Woodin< strongly compact≤supercompact), supercompact, hypercompact cardinals
- η-extendible, extendible cardinals
- almost high jump cardinals
- Vopěnka cardinals, Shelah for supercompactness, high jump cardinals, super high jump cardinals
- n-superstrong (n≥2), n-almost huge, n-super almost huge, n-huge, n-superhuge cardinals (1-huge=huge, etc.)
- exacting cardinals, ultraexacting cardinals
- Wholeness axiom, rank-into-rank (Axioms I3, I2, I1, and I0)

The following even stronger large cardinal properties are not consistent with the axiom of choice, but their existence has not yet been refuted in ZF alone (that is, without use of the axiom of choice).

- weakly Reinhardt cardinal, Reinhardt cardinal, proto-Berkeley cardinal, Berkeley cardinal, super Reinhardt cardinal, totally Reinhardt cardinal, club Berkeley cardinal, limit club Berkeley cardinal

Many of these large cardinals axioms also have virtual versions.
