= Reflection principle =

Kind of proposition in mathematics

In set theory, a branch of mathematics, a reflection principle says that it is possible to find sets that, with respect to any given property, resemble the class of all sets. There are several different forms of the reflection principle depending on exactly what is meant by "resemble". Weak forms of the reflection principle are theorems of Zermelo–Fraenkel set theory ($\mathsf{ZF}$) due to Montague (1961), while stronger forms can be new and very powerful axioms for set theory.

The name "reflection principle" comes from the fact that properties of the universe of all sets are "reflected" down to a smaller set.

== Motivation ==
A naive version of the reflection principle states that "for any property of the universe of all sets we can find a set with the same property". This leads to an immediate contradiction: the universe of all sets contains all sets, but there is no set with the property that it contains all sets. To get useful (and non-contradictory) reflection principles we need to be more careful about what we mean by "property" and what properties we allow.

Reflection principles are associated with attempts to formulate the idea that no one notion, idea, or statement can capture our whole view of the universe of sets. Kurt Gödel described it as follows:

The universe of all sets is structurally indefinable. One possible way to make this statement precise is the following: The universe of sets cannot be uniquely characterized (i.e., distinguished from all its initial segments) by any internal structural property of the membership relation in it which is expressible in any logic of finite or transfinite type, including infinitary logics of any cardinal number. This principle may be considered a generalization of the closure principle.

— 8.7.3, p. 280

All the principles for setting up the axioms of set theory should be reducible to Ackermann's principle: The Absolute is unknowable. The strength of this principle increases as we get stronger and stronger systems of set theory. The other principles are only heuristic principles. Hence, the central principle is the reflection principle, which presumably will be understood better as our experience increases. Meanwhile, it helps to separate out more specific principles which either give some additional information or are not yet seen clearly to be derivable from the reflection principle as we understand it now.

— 8.7.9, p. 283

Generally I believe that, in the last analysis, every axiom of infinity should be derivable from the (extremely plausible) principle that V is indefinable, where definability is to be taken in [a] more and more generalized and idealized sense.

— 8.7.16, p. 285

Georg Cantor expressed similar views on absolute infinity: All cardinality properties are satisfied in this number, in which held by a smaller cardinal.

To find non-contradictory reflection principles we might argue informally as follows. Suppose that we have some collection A of methods for forming sets (for example, taking powersets, subsets, the axiom of replacement, and so on). We can imagine taking all sets obtained by repeatedly applying all these methods, and form these sets into a class X, which can be thought of as a model of some set theory. But in light of this view, V is not exhaustible by a handful of operations, otherwise it would be easily describable from below, this principle is known as inexhaustibility (of V). As a result, V is larger than X. Applying the methods in A to the set X itself would also result in a collection smaller than V, as V is not exhaustible from the image of X under the operations in A. Then we can introduce the following new principle for forming sets: "the collection of all sets obtained from some set by repeatedly applying all methods in the collection A is also a set". After adding this principle to A, V is still not exhaustible by the operations in this new A. This process may be repeated further and further, adding more and more operations to the set A and obtaining larger and larger models X. Each X resembles V in the sense that it shares the property with V of being closed under the operations in A.

We can use this informal argument in two ways. We can try to formalize it in (say) $\mathsf{ZF}$; by doing this we obtain some theorems of $\mathsf{ZF}$, called reflection theorems. Alternatively we can use this argument to motivate introducing new axioms for set theory, such as some axioms asserting existence of large cardinals.

== In ZFC ==
In trying to formalize the argument for the reflection principle of the previous section in $\mathsf{ZF}$, it turns out to be necessary to add some conditions about the collection of properties A (for example, A might be finite). Doing this produces several closely related "reflection theorems" all of which state that we can find a set that is almost a model of ZFC. In contrast to stronger reflection principles, these are provable in $\mathsf{ZFC}$.

One of the most common reflection principles for $\mathsf{ZFC}$ is a theorem schema that can be described as follows: for any formula $\phi(x_1,\ldots,x_n)$ with parameters, if $\phi(x_1,\ldots,x_n)$ is true (in the set-theoretic universe $V$), then there is a level $V_\alpha$ of the cumulative hierarchy such that $V_\alpha\vDash\phi(x_1,\ldots,x_n)$. This is known as the Lévy–Montague reflection principle, or the Lévy reflection principle, principally investigated in Lévy (1960) and Montague (1961). Another version of this reflection principle says that for any finite number of formulas of $\mathsf{ZFC}$ we can find a set $V_\alpha$ in the cumulative hierarchy such that all the formulas in the set are absolute for $V_\alpha$ (which means very roughly that they hold in $V_\alpha$ if and only if they hold in the universe of all sets). So this says that the set $V_\alpha$ resembles the universe of all sets, at least as far as the given finite number of formulas is concerned.

Another reflection principle for $\mathsf{ZFC}$ is a theorem schema that can be described as follows: Let $\phi$ be a formula with at most free variables $x_1, \ldots, x_n$. Then $\mathsf{ZFC}$ proves that

$$(\forall N) (\exists M {\supseteq} N) (\forall x_1, \ldots, x_n {\in} M) (\phi(x_1, \ldots, x_n) \leftrightarrow \phi^M)$$

where $\phi^M$ denotes the relativization of $\phi$ to $M$ (that is, replacing all quantifiers appearing in $\phi$ of the form $\forall x$ and $\exists x$ by $\forall x {\in} M$ and $\exists x {\in} M$, respectively).

Another form of the reflection principle in $\mathsf{ZFC}$ says that for any finite set of axioms of $\mathsf{ZFC}$ we can find a countable transitive model satisfying these axioms. (In particular this proves that, unless inconsistent, $\mathsf{ZFC}$ is not finitely axiomatizable because if it were it would prove the existence of a model of itself, and hence prove its own consistency, contradicting Gödel's second incompleteness theorem.) This version of the reflection theorem is closely related to the Löwenheim–Skolem theorem.

If $\kappa$ is a strong inaccessible cardinal, then there is a closed unbounded subset $C$ of $\kappa$, such that for every $\alpha\in C$, $V_\alpha$ is an elementary substructure of $V_\kappa$.

== As new axioms ==
=== Large cardinals ===
Reflection principles are connected to and can be used to motivate large cardinal axioms. Reinhardt gives the following examples, using Cantor's informal notion of absolute infinity in place of the universe of sets:

It may be helpful to give some informal arguments illustrating the use of reflection principles.
The simplest is perhaps: the universe of sets is inaccessible (i.e., satisfies the replacement axiom), therefore there is an inaccessible cardinal. This can be elaborated somewhat, as follows. Let $\theta_\nu$ enumerate the inaccessible cardinals. By the same sort of reasoning, $\theta_\nu$ is not bounded; the Cantor absolute $\Omega$ (all ordinals) is an inaccessible above any proposed bound $\beta$, therefore there is an inaccessible cardinal above $\beta$. Clearly, then, there are $\Omega$ inaccessibles above below $\Omega$; therefore there is an inaccessible $\kappa$ such that there are $\kappa$ inaccessibles below it (i.e., $\kappa=\theta_\kappa$).

=== Bernays class theory ===
Paul Bernays used a reflection principle as an axiom for one version of set theory (not Von Neumann–Bernays–Gödel set theory, which is a weaker theory). His reflection principle stated roughly that if $A$ is a class with some property, then one can find a transitive set $u$ such that $A\cap u$ has the same property when considered as a subset of the "universe" $u$. This is quite a powerful axiom and implies the existence of several of the smaller large cardinals, such as inaccessible cardinals. (Roughly speaking, the class of all ordinals in $\mathsf{ZFC}$ is an inaccessible cardinal apart from the fact that it is not a set, and the reflection principle can then be used to show that there is a set that has the same property, in other words that is an inaccessible cardinal.) Unfortunately, this cannot be axiomatized directly in $\mathsf{ZFC}$, and a class theory like Morse–Kelley set theory normally has to be used. The consistency of Bernays's reflection principle is implied by the existence of an ω-Erdős cardinal.

More precisely, the axioms of Bernays' class theory are:

1. extensionality
2. class specification: for any formula $\phi$ without $a$ free, $\exists a \forall b (b \in a \leftrightarrow \phi \land b \text{ is a set})$
3. subsets: $b \subseteq a \land a \text{ is a set} \to b \text{ is a set}$
4. reflection: for any formula $\phi$, $\phi(A) \to \exists u (u \text{ is a transitive set} \land \phi^{\mathcal{P} u}(A \cap u))$
5. foundation
6. choice

where $\mathcal{P}$ denotes the powerset.

According to Akihiro Kanamori, in a 1961 paper, Bernays considered the reflection schema

$$\phi \to \exists x (\text{transitive}(x) \land \phi^x)$$

for any formula $\phi$ without $x$ free, where $\text{transitive}(x)$ asserts that $x$ is transitive. Starting with the observation that set parameters $a_1,\ldots,a_n$ can appear in $\phi$ and $x$ can be required to contain them by introducing clauses $\exists y (a_i \in y)$ into $\phi$, Bernays just with this schema established pairing, union, infinity, and replacement, in effect achieving a remarkably economical presentation of $\mathsf{ZF}$.

=== Others ===
Some formulations of Ackermann set theory use a reflection principle. Ackermann's axiom states that, for any formula $\phi$ not mentioning $V$,

$$a \in V \land b \in V \to \forall x (\phi \to x \in V) \to \exists u {\in} V \forall x (x \in u \leftrightarrow \phi)$$

Peter Koellner showed that a general class of reflection principles deemed "intrinsically justified" are either inconsistent or weak, in that they are consistent relative to the Erdös cardinal. However, there are more powerful reflection principles, which are closely related to the various large cardinal axioms. For almost every known large cardinal axiom there is a known reflection principle that implies it, and conversely all but the most powerful known reflection principles are implied by known large cardinal axioms. An example of this is the wholeness axiom, which implies the existence of super-n-huge cardinals for all finite n and its consistency is implied by an I3 rank-into-rank cardinal.

Add an axiom saying that Ord is a Mahlo cardinal — for every closed unbounded class of ordinals C (definable by a formula with parameters), there is a regular ordinal in C. This allows one to derive the existence of strong inaccessible cardinals and much more over any ordinal.

== For arithmetic ==
Reflection principles may be considered for theories of arithmetic, which are generally much weaker than $\mathsf{ZFC}$.

=== Soundness ===
Let $\mathsf{PA}$ denote Peano arithmetic, and $\mathsf{PA}_k$ denote the set of true sentences in the language of PA that are $\Sigma_k$ in the arithmetical hierarchy. Mostowski's reflection theorem states that for each natural number $k$, $\mathsf{PA}$ proves the consistency of $\mathsf{PA}_k$. As each set $\mathsf{PA}_k$ is $\Sigma_k$-definable, this must be expressed as a theorem schema.^{p. 4} These soundness principles are sometimes referred to as syntactic reflection principles, in contrast to the satisfaction-based varieties mentioned above, which are called semantic reflection principles.^{p. 1}

The local reflection principle $Rfn(T)$ for a theory $T$ is the schema that for each sentence $\phi$ of the language of $T$, $\mathrm{Prov}_T(\phi)\implies\phi$. When $Rfn_\Gamma(T)$ denotes the restricted version of the principle only considering those $\phi$ in a class of formulas $\Gamma$, we have that $\mathrm{Con}(T)$ and $Rfn_{\Pi^0_1}(T)$ are equivalent over $T$.^{p. 205}

The uniform reflection principle $RFN(T)$ for a theory $T$ is the schema that for each natural number $n$, $\forall(\ulcorner\phi\urcorner\in\Sigma^0_n\cup\Pi^0_n)\forall(y_0,\ldots,y_m\in\mathbb N)(\mathrm{Pr}_T(\ulcorner\phi(y_0,\ldots,y_n)^*\urcorner\implies\mathrm{Tr}_n(\ulcorner\phi(y_0,\ldots,y_n)^*\urcorner))$, where $\Sigma^0_n\cup\Pi^0_n$ is the union of the sets of Gödel-numbers of $\Sigma^0_n$ and $\Pi^0_n$ formulas, and $\phi(y_0,\ldots,y_n)^*$ is $\phi$ with its free variables $y_0,\ldots,y_m$ replaced with numerals $\underbrace{S\ldots S}_{y_0}0$, etc. in the language of Peano arithmetic, and $\mathrm{Tr}_n$ is the partial truth predicate for $\Sigma^0_n\cup\Pi^0_n$ formulas.^{p. 205}

=== Model reflection ===
For $k\geq 1$, a $\beta_k$-model is a model that has the correct truth values of $\Pi^1_k$ statements, where $\Pi^1_k$ is at the $(k+1)$th level of the analytical hierarchy. A countable $\beta_k$-model of a subsystem of second-order arithmetic consists of a countable set of sets of natural numbers, which may itself be encoded as a subset of $\mathbb N$. The theory $\Pi^1_1\text{-}\mathsf{CA}_0$ proves the existence of a $\beta_1$-model, also known as a $\beta$-model.^{Theorem VII.2.16}

The $\beta_k$-model reflection principle for $\Sigma^1_n$ formulas states that for any $\Sigma^1_n$ formula $\theta(X)$ with $X$ as its only free set variable, for all $X\subseteq\mathbb N$, if $\theta(X)$ holds, then there is a countable coded $\beta_k$-model $M$ where $X\in M$ such that $M\vDash\theta(X)$. An extension $\Sigma^1_k\text{-}\mathsf{DC}_0$ of $\mathsf{ACA}_0$ by a schema of dependent choice is axiomatized. For any $0\leq k$, the system $\Sigma^1_{k+2}\text{-}\mathsf{DC}_0$ is equivalent to $\beta_{k+1}$-reflection for $\Sigma^1_{k+4}$ formulas.^{Theorem VII.7.6}

$\beta$-model reflection has connections to set-theoretic reflection, for example over the weak set theory KP, adding the schema of reflection of $\Pi_n$-formulas to transitive sets ($\phi\implies\exists z(\textrm{transitive}(z)\land\phi^z)$ for all $\Pi_n$ formulas $\phi$) yields the same $\Pi^1_4$-consequeneces as $\mathsf{ACA+BI}$ plus a schema of $\beta$-model reflection for $\Pi^1_{n+1}$ formulas.
