= Subcompact cardinal =

Kind of large cardinal number

In mathematics, a subcompact cardinal is a certain kind of large cardinal number.

A cardinal number κ is subcompact if and only if for every A ⊂ H(κ^{+}) there is a non-trivial elementary embedding j:(H(μ^{+}), B) → (H(κ^{+}), A) (where H(κ^{+}) is the set of all sets of cardinality hereditarily less than κ^{+}) with critical point μ and j(μ) = κ.

Analogously, κ is a quasicompact cardinal if and only if for every A ⊂ H(κ^{+}) there is a non-trivial elementary embedding j:(H(κ^{+}), A) → (H(μ^{+}), B) with critical point κ and j(κ) = μ.

H(λ) consists of all sets whose transitive closure has cardinality less than λ.

Every quasicompact cardinal is subcompact. Quasicompactness is a strengthening of subcompactness in that it projects large cardinal properties upwards. The relationship is analogous to that of extendible versus supercompact cardinals. Quasicompactness may be viewed as a strengthened or "boldface" version of 1-extendibility. Existence of subcompact cardinals implies existence of many 1-extendible cardinals, and hence many superstrong cardinals. Existence of a 2^{κ}-supercompact cardinal κ implies existence of many quasicompact cardinals.

Subcompact cardinals are noteworthy as the least large cardinals implying a failure of the square principle. If κ is subcompact, then the square principle fails at κ. Canonical inner models at the level of subcompact cardinals satisfy the square principle at all but subcompact cardinals. (Existence of such models has not yet been proved, but in any case the square principle can be forced for weaker cardinals.)

Quasicompactness is one of the strongest large cardinal properties that can be witnessed by current inner models that do not use long extenders. For current inner models, the elementary embeddings included are determined by their effect on P(κ) (as computed at the stage the embedding is included), where κ is the critical point. This prevents them from witnessing even a κ^{+} strongly compact cardinal κ.

Subcompact and quasicompact cardinals were defined by Ronald Jensen.
