= Extendible cardinal =

In mathematics, extendible cardinals are large cardinals introduced by Reinhardt (1974), who was partly motivated by reflection principles. Intuitively, such a cardinal represents a point beyond which initial pieces of the universe of sets start to look similar, in the sense that each is elementarily embeddable into a later one.

== Definition ==
For every ordinal η, a cardinal κ is called η-extendible if for some ordinal λ there is a nontrivial elementary embedding j of V_{κ+η} into V_{λ}, where κ is the critical point of j, and as usual V_{α} denotes the αth level of the von Neumann hierarchy. A cardinal κ is called an extendible cardinal if it is η-extendible for every nonzero ordinal η (Kanamori 2003).

== Properties ==
For a cardinal $\kappa$, say that a logic $L$ is $\kappa$-compact if for every set $A$ of $L$-sentences, if every subset of $A$ or cardinality $<\kappa$ has a model, then $A$ has a model. (The usual compactness theorem shows $\aleph_0$-compactness of first-order logic.) Let $L_\kappa^2$ be the infinitary logic for second-order set theory, permitting infinitary conjunctions and disjunctions of length $<\kappa$. $\kappa$ is extendible iff $L_\kappa^2$ is $\kappa$-compact.

== Variants and relation to other cardinals ==
A cardinal κ is called η-C^{(n)}-extendible if there is an elementary embedding j witnessing that κ is η-extendible (that is, j is elementary from V_{κ+η} to some V_{λ} with critical point κ) such that furthermore, V_{j(κ)} is Σ_{n}-correct in V. That is, for every Σ_{n} formula φ, φ holds in V_{j(κ)} if and only if φ holds in V. A cardinal κ is said to be C^{(n)}-extendible if it is η-C^{(n)}-extendible for every ordinal η. Every extendible cardinal is C^{(1)}-extendible, but for n≥1, the least C^{(n)}-extendible cardinal is never C^{(n+1)}-extendible (Bagaria 2011).

Vopěnka's principle implies the existence of extendible cardinals; in fact, Vopěnka's principle (for definable classes) is equivalent to the existence of C^{(n)}-extendible cardinals for all n (Bagaria 2011). All extendible cardinals are supercompact cardinals (Kanamori 2003).

== See also ==
- List of large cardinal properties
- Reinhardt cardinal
