= Tall cardinal =

Type of large cardinal in set theory

In set theory, a tall cardinal κ is a large cardinal that is θ-tall for all ordinals θ, where a cardinal is called θ-tall if there is an elementary embedding j : V → M with critical point κ such that j(κ) > θ and M^{κ} ⊆ M.

Tall cardinals are equiconsistent with strong cardinals.
