= Moti Gitik =

Israeli mathematician

- מוטי גיטיק
- Education: Hebrew University of Jerusalem
- Awards: Karp Prize (2013)
- Scientific career
- Fields: Set theory
- Workplaces: Tel Aviv University
- Thesis: All Uncountable Cardinals can be Singular (1980)
- Doctoral advisors: Azriel Levy; Menachem Magidor
- Website: math.tau.ac.il/~gitik/

Moti Gitik (Hebrew: מוטי גיטיק) is a mathematician, working in set theory, who is professor at the Tel-Aviv University. He was an invited speaker at the 2002 International Congresses of Mathematicians, and became a fellow of the American Mathematical Society in 2012.

== Research ==
Gitik proved the consistency of "all uncountable cardinals are singular" (a strong negation of the axiom of choice) from the consistency of "there is a proper class of strongly compact cardinals". He further proved the equiconsistency of the following statements:

- There is a cardinal κ with Mitchell order κ^{++}.
- There is a measurable cardinal κ with 2^{κ} > κ^{+}.
- There is a strong limit singular cardinal λ with 2^{λ} > λ^{+}.
- The GCH holds below ℵ_{ω}, and 2^{ℵ_{ω}}=ℵ_{ω+2}.

Gitik discovered several methods for building models of ZFC with complicated Cardinal Arithmetic structure. His main results deal with consistency and equi-consistency of non-trivial patterns of the Power Function over singular cardinals.

== Selected publications ==
- Gitik, Moti (1986). "Changing Cofinalities and the Nonstationary Ideal". Israel Journal of Mathematics. 56 (3): 280–314. doi:10.1007/BF02782938.
- Gitik, Moti (1991). "The strength of the failure of the singular cardinal hypothesis". Annals of Pure and Applied Logic. 51 (3): 215–240. doi:10.1016/0168-0072(91)90016-F.
- Gitik, Moti; Magidor, Menachem (1992). "The Singular Cardinal Hypothesis Revisited". Set Theory of the Continuum. Mathematical Sciences Research Institute Publications. Vol. 26. pp. 243–279. doi:10.1007/978-1-4613-9754-0_16. ISBN 978-1-4613-9756-4.
- Gitik, Moti (1996). "Blowing up the power of a singular cardinal". Annals of Pure and Applied Logic. 80 (1): 17–33. arXiv:math/9404204. doi:10.1016/0168-0072(95)00046-1.
- Gitik, Moti (2020). "Extender based forcings with overlapping extenders and negations of the Shelah Weak Hypothesis". Journal of Mathematical Logic. 20 (3): 2050013. doi:10.1142/S0219061320500130. S2CID 46948714.
