= Compact cardinal =

Compact cardinal may refer to:

- Weakly compact cardinal
- Subcompact cardinal
- Supercompact cardinal
- Strongly compact cardinal
