= Berkeley cardinal =

Set-theoretic concept

In set theory, Berkeley cardinals are certain large cardinals suggested by Hugh Woodin in a seminar at the University of California, Berkeley in about 1992.

A Berkeley cardinal is a cardinal κ in a model of Zermelo–Fraenkel set theory with the property that for every transitive set M that includes κ and α < κ, there is a nontrivial elementary embedding of M into M with α < critical point < κ. Berkeley cardinals are a strictly stronger cardinal axiom than Reinhardt cardinals, implying that they are not compatible with the axiom of choice.

A weakening of being a Berkeley cardinal is that for every binary relation R on V_{κ}, there is a nontrivial elementary embedding of (V_{κ}, R) into itself. This implies that we have elementary

j_{1}, j_{2}, j_{3}, ...
j_{1}: (V_{κ}, ∈) → (V_{κ}, ∈),
j_{2}: (V_{κ}, ∈, j_{1}) → (V_{κ}, ∈, j_{1}),
j_{3}: (V_{κ}, ∈, j_{1}, j_{2}) → (V_{κ}, ∈, j_{1}, j_{2}),

and so on. This can be continued any finite number of times, and to the extent that the model has dependent choice, transfinitely. Thus, plausibly, this notion can be strengthened simply by asserting more dependent choice.

While all these notions are incompatible with Zermelo–Fraenkel set theory (ZFC), their $\Pi^V_2$ consequences do not appear to be false. There is no known inconsistency with ZFC in asserting that, for example:
For every ordinal λ, there is a transitive model of ZF + Berkeley cardinal that is closed under λ sequences.

== See also ==
- List of large cardinal properties

== Sources ==
- Chen, Evan; Koellner, Peter (2015), Math 145b Lecture Notes (PDF)
- Koellner, Peter (2014), The Search for Deep Inconsistency (PDF), archived from the original (PDF) on 2018-01-01
