= Ineffable cardinal =

Kind of large cardinal number

In the mathematics of transfinite numbers, an ineffable cardinal is a certain kind of large cardinal number, introduced by Jensen & Kunen (1969). In the following definitions, $\kappa$ will always be a regular uncountable cardinal number.

A cardinal number $\kappa$ is called almost ineffable if for every $f: \kappa \to \mathcal{P}(\kappa)$ (where $\mathcal{P}(\kappa)$ is the powerset of $\kappa$) with the property that $f(\delta)$ is a subset of $\delta$ for all ordinals $\delta < \kappa$, there is a subset $S$ of $\kappa$ having cardinality $\kappa$ and homogeneous for $f,$ in the sense that for any $\delta_1 < \delta_2$ in $S$, $f(\delta_1) = f(\delta_2) \cap \delta_1$.

A cardinal number $\kappa$ is called ineffable if for every binary-valued function $f : [\kappa]^2\to \{0,1\}$, there is a stationary subset of $\kappa$ on which $f$ is homogeneous: that is, either $f$ maps all unordered pairs of elements drawn from that subset to zero, or it maps all such unordered pairs to one. An equivalent formulation is that a cardinal $\kappa$ is ineffable if for every sequence $\langle A_\alpha:\alpha\in\kappa\rangle$ such that each $A_\alpha\subseteq\alpha$, there is $A\subseteq\kappa$ such that $\{\alpha\in\kappa:A\cap\alpha=A_\alpha\}$ is stationary in κ.

Another equivalent formulation is that a regular uncountable cardinal $\kappa$ is ineffable if for every set $S$ of cardinality $\kappa$ of subsets of $\kappa$, there is a normal (i.e. closed under diagonal intersection) non-trivial $\kappa$-complete filter $\mathcal F$ on $\kappa$ deciding $S$: that is, for any $X\in S$, either $X\in\mathcal F$ or $\kappa\setminus X\in\mathcal F$. This is similar to a characterization of weakly compact cardinals.

More generally, $\kappa$ is called $n$-ineffable (for a positive integer $n$) if for every $f : [\kappa]^n\to \{0,1\}$ there is a stationary subset of $\kappa$ on which $f$ is homogeneous (takes the same value for all unordered $n$-tuples drawn from the subset). Thus, it is ineffable if and only if it is 2-ineffable. Ineffability is strictly weaker than 3-ineffability.^{p. 399}

A totally ineffable cardinal is a cardinal that is $n$-ineffable for every $2 \leq n < \aleph_0$. If $\kappa$ is $(n+1)$-ineffable, then the set of $n$-ineffable cardinals below $\kappa$ is a stationary subset of $\kappa$.

Every $n$-ineffable cardinal is $n$-almost ineffable (with set of $n$-almost ineffable below it stationary), and every $n$-almost ineffable is $n$-subtle (with set of $n$-subtle below it stationary). The least $n$-subtle cardinal is not even weakly compact (and unlike ineffable cardinals, the least $n$-almost ineffable is $\Pi^1_2$-describable), but $(n-1)$-ineffable cardinals are stationary below every $n$-subtle cardinal.

A cardinal κ is completely ineffable if there is a non-empty $R \subseteq \mathcal{P}(\kappa)$ such that

- every $A \in R$ is stationary
- for every $A \in R$ and $f : [\kappa]^2\to \{0,1\}$, there is $B \subseteq A$ homogeneous for f with $B \in R$.

Using any finite $n$ > 1 in place of 2 would lead to the same definition, so completely ineffable cardinals are totally ineffable (and have greater consistency strength). Completely ineffable cardinals are $\Pi^1_n$-indescribable for every n, but the property of being completely ineffable is $\Delta^2_1$.

The consistency strength of completely ineffable is below that of 1-iterable cardinals, which in turn is below remarkable cardinals, which in turn is below ω-Erdős cardinals. A list of large cardinal axioms by consistency strength is available in the section below.

== See also ==
- List of large cardinal properties
