= Mitchell order =

Mathematical concept

In mathematical set theory, the Mitchell order is a well-founded preorder on the set of normal measures on a measurable cardinal κ. It is named for William Mitchell. We say that M ◅ N (this is a strict order) if M is in the ultrapower model defined by N. Intuitively, this means that M is a weaker measure than N (note, for example, that κ will still be measurable in the ultrapower for N, since M is a measure on it).

In fact, the Mitchell order can be defined on the set (or proper class, as the case may be) of extenders for κ; but if it is so defined it may fail to be transitive, or even well-founded, provided κ has sufficiently strong large cardinal properties. Well-foundedness fails specifically for rank-into-rank extenders; but Itay Neeman showed in 2004 that it holds for all weaker types of extender.

The Mitchell rank of a measure is the order type of its predecessors under ◅; since ◅ is well-founded this is always an ordinal. Using the method of coherent sequences, for any rank $\leq\kappa^{++}$ Mitchell constructed an inner model for a measurable cardinal of rank $\kappa$.

A cardinal that has measures of Mitchell rank α for each α < β is said to be β-measurable.
