= Strong cardinal =

In set theory, a strong cardinal is a type of large cardinal. It is a weakening of the notion of a supercompact cardinal.

== Formal definition ==
If λ is any ordinal, κ is λ-strong means that κ is a cardinal number and there exists an elementary embedding j from the universe V into a transitive inner model M with critical point κ and

$$V_\lambda\subseteq M$$

That is, M agrees with V on an initial segment. Then κ is strong means that it is λ-strong for all ordinals λ.

== Relationship with other large cardinals ==
By definitions, strong cardinals lie below supercompact cardinals and above measurable cardinals in the consistency strength hierarchy.

κ is κ+1-strong if and only if it is measurable. If κ is strong or λ-strong for λ ≥ κ+2, then the ultrafilter U witnessing that κ is measurable will be in V_{κ+2} and thus in M. So for any α < κ, we have that there exist an ultrafilter U in j(V_{κ}) − j(V_{α}), remembering that j(α) = α. Using the elementary embedding backwards, we get that there is an ultrafilter in V_{κ} − V_{α}. So there are arbitrarily large measurable cardinals below κ which is regular, and thus κ is a limit of κ-many measurable cardinals.

Strong cardinals also lie below superstrong cardinals and Woodin cardinals in consistency strength. However, the least strong cardinal is larger than the least superstrong cardinal.

Every strong cardinal is strongly unfoldable and therefore totally indescribable.

== Bibliography ==
- Kanamori, Akihiro (2003). The Higher Infinite : Large Cardinals in Set Theory from Their Beginnings (2nd ed.). Springer. ISBN 3-540-00384-3.
