= Unfoldable cardinal =

In mathematics, an unfoldable cardinal is a certain kind of large cardinal number.

Formally, a cardinal number κ is λ-unfoldable if and only if for every transitive model M of cardinality κ of ZFC-minus-power set such that κ is in M and M contains all its sequences of length less than κ, there is a non-trivial elementary embedding j of M into a transitive model with the critical point of j being κ and j(κ) ≥ λ.

A cardinal is unfoldable if and only if it is an λ-unfoldable for all ordinals λ.

A cardinal number κ is strongly λ-unfoldable if and only if for every transitive model M of cardinality κ of ZFC-minus-power set such that κ is in M and M contains all its sequences of length less than κ, there is a non-trivial elementary embedding j of M into a transitive model "N" with the critical point of j being κ, j(κ) ≥ λ, and V_{λ} is a subset of N. Without loss of generality, we can demand also that N contains all its sequences of length λ.

Likewise, a cardinal is strongly unfoldable if and only if it is strongly λ-unfoldable for all λ.

These properties are essentially weaker versions of strong and supercompact cardinals, consistent with V = L. Many theorems related to these cardinals have generalizations to their unfoldable or strongly unfoldable counterparts. For example, the existence of a strongly unfoldable implies the consistency of a slightly weaker version of the proper forcing axiom.

== Relations between large cardinal properties ==
Assuming V = L, the least unfoldable cardinal is greater than the least indescribable cardinal.^{p.14} Assuming a Ramsey cardinal exists, it is less than the least Ramsey cardinal.^{p.3}

A Ramsey cardinal is unfoldable and will be strongly unfoldable in L. It may fail to be strongly unfoldable in V, however.

In L, any unfoldable cardinal is strongly unfoldable; thus unfoldable and strongly unfoldable have the same consistency strength.

A cardinal k is κ-strongly unfoldable, and κ-unfoldable, if and only if it is weakly compact. A κ+ω-unfoldable cardinal is indescribable and preceded by a stationary set of totally indescribable cardinals.
