= Extender (set theory) =

In set theory, an extender is a system of ultrafilters which represents an elementary embedding witnessing large cardinal properties. A nonprincipal ultrafilter is the most basic case of an extender.

A $(\kappa, \lambda)$-extender can be defined as an elementary embedding of some model $M$ of ZFC^{−} (ZFC minus the power set axiom) having critical point $\kappa \in M$, and which maps $\kappa$ to an ordinal at least equal to $\lambda$. It can also be defined as a collection of ultrafilters, one for each $n$-tuple drawn from $\lambda$.

== Formal definition of an extender ==
Let κ and λ be cardinals with κ≤λ. Then, a set $E = \{E_a | a\in [\lambda]^{<\omega}\}$ is called a (κ,λ)-extender if the following properties are satisfied:

1. each $E_a$ is a κ-complete nonprincipal ultrafilter on [κ]^{<ω} and furthermore
  1. at least one $E_a$ is not κ^{+}-complete,
  2. for each $\alpha \in \kappa,$ at least one $E_a$ contains the set $\{s \in [\kappa]^{|a|} : \alpha \in s\}.$
2. (Coherence) The $E_a$ are coherent (so that the ultrapowers Ult(V,E_{a}) form a directed system).
3. (Normality) If $f$ is such that $\{s \in [\kappa]^{|a|}: f(s) \in \max s\} \in E_a,$ then for some $b \supseteq a,\ \{t \in \kappa^{|b|} : (f \circ \pi_{ba})(t) \in t\} \in E_b.$
4. (Wellfoundedness) The limit ultrapower Ult(V,E) is wellfounded (where Ult(V,E) is the direct limit of the ultrapowers Ult(V,E_{a})).

By coherence, one means that if $a$ and $b$ are finite subsets of λ such that $b$ is a superset of $a,$ then if $X$ is an element of the ultrafilter $E_b$ and one chooses the right way to project $X$ down to a set of sequences of length $|a|,$ then $X$ is an element of $E_a.$ More formally, for $b = \{\alpha_1,\dots,\alpha_n\},$ where $\alpha_1 < \dots < \alpha_n < \lambda,$ and $a = \{\alpha_{i_1},\dots,\alpha_{i_m}\},$ where $m \leq n$ and for $j \leq m$ the $i_j$ are pairwise distinct and at most $n,$ we define the projection $\pi_{ba} : \{\xi_1, \dots, \xi_n\} \mapsto \{\xi_{i_1}, \dots, \xi_{i_m}\}\ (\xi_1 < \dots < \xi_n).$

Then $E_a$ and $E_b$ cohere if $X \in E_a \iff \{s : \pi_{ba}(s) \in X\} \in E_b.$

== Defining an extender from an elementary embedding ==
Given an elementary embedding $j : V \to M,$ which maps the set-theoretic universe $V$ into a transitive inner model $M,$ with critical point κ, and a cardinal λ, κ≤λ≤j(κ), one defines $E = \{E_a | a \in [\lambda]^{<\omega}\}$ as follows: $\text{for } a \in [\lambda]^{<\omega}, X \subseteq [\kappa]^{<\omega} : \quad X \in E_a \iff a \in j(X).$ One can then show that $E$ has all the properties stated above in the definition and therefore is a (κ,λ)-extender.
