= Shrewd cardinal =

Type of large cardinal number

In mathematics, a shrewd cardinal is a certain kind of large cardinal number introduced by (Rathjen 1995), extending the definition of indescribable cardinals.

For an ordinal λ, a cardinal number κ is called λ-shrewd if for every proposition φ using a predicate symbol and with one free variable, and set A ⊆ V_{κ} with (V_{κ+λ}, ∈, A) ⊧ φ(κ) there exists an α, λ' < κ with (V_{α+λ'}, ∈, A ∩ V_{α}) ⊧ φ(α). It is called shrewd if it is λ-shrewd for every λ^{(Definition 4.1)} (including λ > κ).

This definition extends the concept of indescribability to transfinite levels. A λ-shrewd cardinal is also μ-shrewd for any ordinal μ < λ.^{(Corollary 4.3)} Shrewdness was developed by Michael Rathjen as part of his ordinal analysis of Π^{1}_{2}-comprehension. It is essentially the nonrecursive analog to the stability property for admissible ordinals.

More generally, a cardinal number κ is called λ-Π_{m}-shrewd if for every Π_{m} proposition φ, and set A ⊆ V_{κ} with (V_{κ+λ}, ∈, A) ⊧ φ(κ) there exists an α, λ' < κ with (V_{α+λ'}, ∈, A ∩ V_{α}) ⊧ φ(α).^{(Definition 4.1)} Π_{m} is one of the levels of the Lévy hierarchy, in short one looks at formulas with m-1 alternations of quantifiers with the outermost quantifier being universal.

For finite n, an n-Π_{m}-shrewd cardinals is the same thing as a Π_{m}^{n}-indescribable cardinal.

If κ is a subtle cardinal, then the set of κ-shrewd cardinals is stationary in κ.^{(Lemma 4.6)} A cardinal is strongly unfoldable iff it is shrewd.

λ-shrewdness is an improved version of λ-indescribability, as defined in Drake; this cardinal property differs in that the reflected substructure must be (V_{α+λ}, ∈, A ∩ V_{α}), making it impossible for a cardinal κ to be κ-indescribable. Also, the monotonicity property is lost: a λ-indescribable cardinal may fail to be α-indescribable for some ordinal α < λ.
