= Kunen's inconsistency theorem =

Theorem in transfinite set theory

In set theory, a branch of mathematics, Kunen's inconsistency theorem, proved by Kenneth Kunen (1971), shows that several plausible large cardinal axioms are inconsistent with the axiom of choice.

Some consequences of Kunen's theorem (or its proof) are:

- There is no non-trivial elementary embedding of the universe V into itself. In other words, there is no Reinhardt cardinal.
- If j is an elementary embedding of the universe V into an inner model M, and λ is the smallest fixed point of j above the critical point κ of j, then M does not contain the set j "λ (the image of j restricted to λ).
- There is no ω-huge cardinal.
- There is no non-trivial elementary embedding of V_{λ+2} into itself.

It is not known if Kunen's theorem still holds in ZF (ZFC without the axiom of choice), though Suzuki (1999) showed that there is no definable elementary embedding from V into V. That is there is no formula J in the language of set theory such that for some parameter p∈V for all sets x∈V and y∈V: $j(x)=y \leftrightarrow J(x,y,p) \,.$

Kunen used Morse–Kelley set theory in his proof. If the proof is re-written to use ZFC, then one must add the assumption that replacement holds for formulas involving j. Otherwise one could not even show that j "λ exists as a set. The forbidden set j "λ is crucial to the proof. The proof first shows that it cannot be in M. The other parts of the theorem are derived from that.

It is possible to have models of set theory that have elementary embeddings into themselves, at least if one assumes some mild large cardinal axioms. For example, if 0^{#} exists then there is an elementary embedding from the constructible universe L into itself. This does not contradict Kunen's theorem because if 0^{#} exists then L cannot be the whole universe of sets.

== See also ==
- Rank-into-rank
