= Lightface analytic game =

Infinite game in descriptive set theory whose payoff set is a lightface analytic set

In descriptive set theory, a lightface analytic game is an infinite two-player game of perfect information whose payoff set is a lightface analytic (Σ^{1}_{1}) subset of Baire space. The determinacy of all lightface analytic games is equivalent, over ZFC, to the existence of 0^{#}, a result known as the Martin–Harrington theorem.

== Background ==
=== Infinite games ===
The games studied here are Gale-Stewart games. Two players, conventionally called Player I and Player II, alternate choosing natural numbers, with Player I going first:

Player I chooses a_{0}, Player II chooses a_{1}, Player I chooses a_{2}, ...

After infinitely many rounds, the two players have together produced an infinite sequence (a_{0}, a_{1}, a_{2}, ...) in Baire space ω^{ω} — the set of all infinite sequences of natural numbers equipped with the product of the discrete topology. A payoff set A ⊆ ω^{ω} is fixed in advance; Player I wins if the resulting sequence belongs to A, and Player II wins otherwise.

A strategy for Player I is a function σ that maps each finite sequence of even length (representing the moves played so far) to a natural number (Player I's next move). A strategy for Player II is defined analogously for sequences of odd length. A strategy is a winning strategy if following it guarantees a win regardless of the opponent's play. A game is determined if one of the two players has a winning strategy.

=== The determinacy hierarchy ===
Not all infinite games are determined: using the axiom of choice one can construct an undetermined game. However, determinacy holds for payoff sets of low descriptive complexity. The classical results form a hierarchy:

| Complexity of payoff set | Determinacy | Reference |
|---|---|---|
| Open / closed | Provable in ZFC | Gale–Stewart theorem (1953) |
| Borel | Provable in ZFC | Martin (1975) |
| Lightface Σ^{1}_{1} (lightface analytic) | Equivalent to existence of 0^{#} | Martin–Harrington (1978) |
| Σ^{1}_{1} (analytic, boldface) | Follows from a measurable cardinal | Martin (1970) |
| All projective sets | Follows from infinitely many Woodin cardinals | Martin–Steel, Woodin (1985–88) |

== Lightface versus boldface ==
The lightface/boldface distinction is central to this subject. A set A ⊆ ω^{ω} is boldface analytic (Σ^{1}_{1}) if it is the projection of a closed set in a product space, equivalently if there exists a tree T on ω × ω such that A is the set of first coordinates of infinite branches through T. The lightface version adds an effectivity constraint: A is lightface analytic (Σ^{1}_{1}) if T can be taken to be a computable (recursive) subset of (ω × ω)^{<ω}.

Equivalently, a set is lightface analytic if it is recursively enumerable relative to no oracle — it can be described without any real-number parameters. Boldface analytic sets may require real-number parameters; the lightface class is strictly smaller.

This distinction has a direct consequence for determinacy: boldface analytic determinacy follows from the existence of a measurable cardinal, a relatively strong large-cardinal assumption. Lightface analytic determinacy requires only the weaker assumption that 0^{#} exists. Conversely, Leo Harrington showed that lightface analytic determinacy cannot be proved in ZFC alone, and in fact implies the existence of 0^{#}.

== The Martin–Harrington theorem ==
The central result of the subject is:

Theorem (Martin–Harrington, 1978). The following are equivalent over ZFC:

1. All lightface analytic games are determined.
2. 0^{#} exists.

=== Forward direction: 0^{#} implies determinacy ===
Donald A. Martin proved that if 0^{#} exists then all lightface analytic games are determined. The key tool is the sequence of Silver indiscernibles encoded by 0^{#}. These indiscernibles provide a uniform way to build winning strategies for lightface analytic games: the computable tree defining the payoff set can be analyzed using the indiscernibles, and the resulting structure allows one to determine which player wins and to explicitly construct a winning strategy.

=== Reverse direction: determinacy implies 0^{#} ===
Leo Harrington proved the converse in 1978: if all lightface analytic games are determined, then 0^{#} exists. This direction is considerably harder. Harrington's proof uses the theory of admissible sets and admissible ordinals (in particular, Barwise compactness) to show that determinacy of a certain lightface analytic game forces the existence of a model of set theory with a non-trivial elementary embedding j : L → L, which is equivalent to the existence of 0^{#}. A later forcing-free proof of this direction was given by Sami (1999).

== 0^{#} and the constructible universe ==
0^{#} (zero sharp) is a real number — formally a subset of ω — that encodes the complete first-order theory of Gödel's constructible universe L with respect to its Silver indiscernibles. The Silver indiscernibles are a club class of ordinals that are indistinguishable from one another by any first-order formula of set theory with parameters from lower in the indiscernible sequence.

The existence of 0^{#} is independent of ZFC. If 0^{#} exists then L ≠ V (the constructible universe is a proper inner model of the true universe), and every uncountable cardinal of V is a measurable cardinal in L[0^{#}]. The existence of a measurable cardinal implies that 0^{#} exists, but not conversely; 0^{#} is a strictly weaker assumption.

== Relativization ==
The theorem relativizes to arbitrary reals. For any real x, Π^{1}_{1}(x) determinacy — determinacy of all games whose payoff set is lightface co-analytic relative to x as an oracle — is equivalent to the existence of x^{#}, the sharp for the inner model L[x]. The original Martin–Harrington theorem is the special case x = ∅.

== See also ==
- Analytic set
- Analytical hierarchy
- Borel determinacy theorem
- Descriptive set theory
- Projective determinacy
- Zero sharp
