= Remarkable cardinal =

In mathematics, a remarkable cardinal is a certain kind of large cardinal number.

A cardinal κ is called remarkable if for all regular cardinals 𝜃 > κ, there exist π, M, 𝜆, 𝜎, N and ρ such that:

1. π : M → H_{𝜃} is an elementary embedding
2. M is countable and transitive
3. π(𝜆) = κ
4. 𝜎 : M → N is an elementary embedding with critical point 𝜆
5. N is countable and transitive
6. ρ = M ∩ Ord is a regular cardinal in N
7. ρ(𝜆) > ρ
8. M = H^{N}_{ρ}, i.e., M ∈ N and N ⊨ "M is the set of all sets that are hereditarily smaller than ρ".

Equivalently, κ is remarkable if and only if for every 𝜆 > κ there is 𝜆̅ < κ such that in some forcing extension V [G], there is an elementary embedding j : V ^{V}_{𝜆̅} → V ^{V}_{𝜆} satisfying j(crit(j)) = κ. Although the definition is similar to one of the definitions of supercompact cardinals, the elementary embedding here only has to exist in V [G], not in V.

== See also ==
- Hereditarily countable set
