= Reinhardt cardinal =

Set-theoretic concept

In set theory, a Reinhardt cardinal is a kind of large cardinal. Reinhardt cardinals are considered under ZF (Zermelo–Fraenkel set theory without the axiom of choice), because they are inconsistent with ZFC (ZF with the axiom of choice). They were suggested (Reinhardt 1967, 1974) by American mathematician William Nelson Reinhardt (1939–1998).

== Definition ==
A Reinhardt cardinal is the critical point of a non-trivial elementary embedding $j:V\to V$ of $V$ into itself.

This definition refers explicitly to the proper class $j$. In standard ZF, classes are of the form $\{x|\phi(x,a)\}$ for some set $a$ and formula $\phi$. But it was shown in Suzuki (1999) that no such class is an elementary embedding $j:V\to V$. So Reinhardt cardinals are inconsistent with this notion of class.

There are other formulations of Reinhardt cardinals which are not known to be inconsistent. One is to add a new function symbol $j$ to the language of ZF, together with axioms stating that $j$ is an elementary embedding of $V$, and Separation and Collection axioms for all formulas involving $j$. Another is to use a class theory such as NBG or KM, which admit classes which need not be definable in the sense above.

== Kunen's inconsistency theorem ==
Kunen (1971) proved his inconsistency theorem, showing that the existence of an elementary embedding $j:V\to V$ contradicts NBG with the axiom of choice (and ZFC extended by $j$). His proof uses the axiom of choice, and it is still an open question whether such an embedding is consistent with NBG without the axiom of choice (or with ZF plus the extra symbol $j$ and its attendant axioms).

Kunen's theorem is not simply a consequence of Suzuki (1999), as it is a consequence of NBG, and hence does not require the assumption that $j$ is a definable class. Also, assuming $0^\#$ exists, then there is an elementary embedding of a transitive model $M$ of ZFC (in fact Goedel's constructible universe $L$) into itself. But such embeddings are not classes of $M$.

== Consistency in ZF ==
Unsolved problem in mathematics
Does ZF set theory refute the existence of Reinhardt cardinals?
More unsolved problems in mathematics

As of August 2026, no peer-reviewed publications exist refuting the existence of a Reinhardt cardinal in ZF alone.

In 2025, in a peer-reviewed article for which he won the Hausdorff Medal, Farmer Schlutzenberg proved that the existence of $j: V_{\lambda+2} \prec V_{\lambda+2}$, where $\lambda$ is a certain ordinal related to the critical point of $j$, which was ruled out in ZFC as a strengthening Kunen's result, is in fact consistent with ZF, assuming the consistency of I0 cardinals with ZFC.

In January 2026, Rupert McCallum posted an arXiv preprint claiming that the "next level up", $j: V_{\lambda+3} \prec V_{\lambda+3}$, is incompatible with ZF, meaning that Reinhardt cardinals are also incompatible with ZF. However, it was never peer-reviewed, and in August 2026, it was withdrawn, with the author stating that an error was found.

== Stronger axioms ==
There are some variations of Reinhardt cardinals, forming a hierarchy of hypotheses asserting the existence of elementary embeddings $V\to V$.

A super Reinhardt cardinal is $\kappa$ such that for every ordinal $\alpha$, there is an elementary embedding $j : V\to V$ with $j(\kappa)>\alpha$ and having critical point $\kappa$.

The following axioms were introduced by Apter and Sargsyan:

J3: There is a nontrivial elementary embedding $j: V\to V$
J2: There is a nontrivial elementary embedding $j: V\to V$ and DC_{$\lambda$} holds, where $\lambda$ is the least fixed-point above the critical point.
J1: For every ordinal $\alpha$, there is an elementary embedding $j : V\to V$ with $j(\kappa)>\alpha$ and having critical point $\kappa$.

Each of J1 and J2 immediately imply J3. A cardinal $\kappa$ as in J1 is known as a super Reinhardt cardinal.

Berkeley cardinals are stronger large cardinals suggested by Woodin.

== See also ==
- List of large cardinal properties
