= Shelah cardinal =

In axiomatic set theory, Shelah cardinals are a kind of large cardinals. A cardinal $\kappa$ is called Shelah iff for every $f:\kappa\rightarrow\kappa$, there exists a transitive class $N$ and an elementary embedding $j:V\rightarrow N$ with critical point $\kappa$; and $V_{j(f)(\kappa )}\subset N$.

A Shelah cardinal has a normal ultrafilter containing the set of weakly hyper-Woodin cardinals below it.
