= Subtle =

Subtle may refer to:

- Subtle (band), a musical group consisting of members of the anticon. hip-hop collective
- Doctor Subtilis, John Duns Scotus
- Subtle body, an idea in mysticism, yoga, and tantra
- The Subtle Knife, a novel by Philip Pullman and the second book in the trilogy His Dark Materials
- Subtle, a character in The Alchemist (play) by Ben Jonson
- Subtle cardinal, in mathematics
