= Wholeness axiom =

Axiom of set theory

In mathematics, the wholeness axiom is a strong axiom of set theory introduced by Paul Corazza in 2000.

== Statement ==
The wholeness axiom states roughly that there is an elementary embedding j from the Von Neumann universe V to itself. This has to be stated carefully to avoid Kunen's inconsistency theorem stating (roughly) that no such embedding exists.

More specifically, as Samuel Gomes da Silva states, "the inconsistency is avoided by omitting from the schema all instances of the Replacement Axiom for j-formulas". Thus, the wholeness axiom differs from Reinhardt cardinals (another way of providing elementary embeddings from V to itself) by allowing the axiom of choice and instead modifying the axiom of replacement. However, Holmes, Forster & Libert (2012) write that Corrazza's theory should be "naturally viewed as a version of Zermelo set theory rather than ZFC".

If the wholeness axiom is consistent, then it is also consistent to add to the wholeness axiom the assertion that all sets are hereditarily ordinal definable. The consistency of stratified versions of the wholeness axiom, introduced by Hamkins (2001), was studied by Apter (2012).
