= Vopěnka's principle =

Large cardinal axiom introduced by Vopěnka

In mathematics, Vopěnka's principle is a large cardinal axiom. The intuition behind the axiom is that the set-theoretical universe is so large that in every proper class, some members are similar to others, with this similarity formalized through elementary embeddings.

Vopěnka's principle was first introduced by Petr Vopěnka and independently considered by H. Jerome Keisler, and was written up by Solovay, Reinhardt & Kanamori (1978). According to Pudlák (2013, p. 204), Vopěnka's principle was originally intended as a joke: Vopěnka was apparently unenthusiastic about large cardinals and introduced his principle as a bogus large cardinal property, planning to show later that it was not consistent. However, before publishing his inconsistency proof he found a flaw in it.

== Definition ==
Vopěnka's principle asserts that for every proper class of binary relations (each with set-sized domain), there is one elementarily embeddable into another. This cannot be stated as a single sentence of ZFC as it involves a quantification over classes. A cardinal κ is called a Vopěnka cardinal if it is inaccessible and Vopěnka's principle holds in the rank V_{κ} (allowing arbitrary S ⊂ V_{κ} as "classes").

Many equivalent formulations are possible. For example, Vopěnka's principle is equivalent to each of the following statements.

- For every proper class of simple directed graphs, there are two members of the class with a homomorphism between them.
- For any signature Σ and any proper class of Σ-structures, there are two members of the class with an elementary embedding between them.
- For every predicate P and proper class S of ordinals, there is a non-trivial elementary embedding j:(V_{κ}, ∈, P) → (V_{λ}, ∈, P) for some κ and λ in S.
- The category of ordinals cannot be fully embedded in the category of graphs.
- Every subfunctor of an accessible functor is accessible.
- (In a definable classes setting) For every natural number n, there exists a C^{(n)}-extendible cardinal.

== Strength ==
Even when restricted to predicates and proper classes definable in first order set theory, the principle implies existence of Σ_{n} correct extendible cardinals for every n.

If κ is an almost huge cardinal, then a strong form of Vopěnka's principle holds in V_{κ}:

There is a κ-complete ultrafilter U such that for every {R_{i}: i < κ} where each R_{i} is a binary relation and R_{i} ∈ V_{κ}, there is S ∈ U and a non-trivial elementary embedding j: R_{a} → R_{b} for every a < b in S.
