= Weakly compact cardinal =

Type of large cardinal in set theory

In mathematics, a weakly compact cardinal is a certain kind of cardinal number introduced by Erdős & Tarski (1961); weakly compact cardinals are large cardinals, meaning that their existence cannot be proven from the standard axioms of set theory. (Tarski originally called them "not strongly incompact" cardinals.)

Formally, a cardinal κ is defined to be weakly compact if it is uncountable and for every function f: [κ] ^{2} → {0, 1} there is a set of cardinality κ that is homogeneous for f. In this context, [κ] ^{2} means the set of 2-element subsets of κ, and a subset S of κ is homogeneous for f if either all of [S]^{2} maps to 0 or all of it maps to 1.

The name "weakly compact" refers to the fact that if a cardinal is weakly compact then a certain related infinitary language satisfies a version of the compactness theorem; see below.

== Equivalent formulations ==
The following are equivalent for any uncountable cardinal κ:

1. κ is weakly compact.
2. for every λ<κ, natural number n ≥ 2, and function f: [κ]^{n} → λ, there is a set of cardinality κ that is homogeneous for f. (Drake 1974, chapter 7 theorem 3.5)
3. κ is inaccessible and has the tree property, that is, every tree of height κ has either a level of size κ or a branch of size κ.
4. Every linear order of cardinality κ has an ascending or a descending sequence of order type κ. (W. W. Comfort, S. Negrepontis, The Theory of Ultrafilters, p.185)
5. κ is $\Pi^1_1$-indescribable.
6. κ has the extension property. In other words, for all U ⊂ V_{κ} there exists a transitive set X with κ ∈ X, and a subset S ⊂ X, such that (V_{κ}, ∈, U) is an elementary substructure of (X, ∈, S). Here, U and S are regarded as unary predicates.
7. For every set S of cardinality κ of subsets of κ, there is a non-trivial κ-complete filter that decides S.
8. κ is κ-unfoldable.
9. κ is inaccessible and the infinitary language L_{κ,κ} satisfies the weak compactness theorem.
10. κ is inaccessible and the infinitary language L_{κ,ω} satisfies the weak compactness theorem.
11. κ is inaccessible and for every transitive set $M$ of cardinality κ with κ $\in M$, ${}^{<\kappa}M\subset M$, and satisfying a sufficiently large fragment of ZFC, there is an elementary embedding $j$ from $M$ to a transitive set $N$ of cardinality κ such that $^{<\kappa}N\subset N$, with critical point $crit(j)=$κ. (Hauser 1991, Theorem 1.3)
12. $\kappa=\kappa^{<\kappa}$ ($\kappa^{<\kappa}$ defined as $\sum_{\lambda<\kappa}\kappa^\lambda$) and every $\kappa$-complete filter of a $\kappa$-complete field of sets of cardinality $\leq\kappa$ is contained in a $\kappa$-complete ultrafilter. (W. W. Comfort, S. Negrepontis, The Theory of Ultrafilters, p.185)
13. $\kappa$ has Alexander's property, i.e. for any space $X$ with a $\kappa$-subbase $\mathcal A$ with cardinality $\leq\kappa$, and every cover of $X$ by elements of $\mathcal A$ has a subcover of cardinality $<\kappa$, then $X$ is $\kappa$-compact. (W. W. Comfort, S. Negrepontis, The Theory of Ultrafilters, p.182--185)
14. $(2^{\kappa})_\kappa$ is $\kappa$-compact. (W. W. Comfort, S. Negrepontis, The Theory of Ultrafilters, p.185)

A language L_{κ,κ} is said to satisfy the weak compactness theorem if whenever Σ is a set of sentences of cardinality at most κ and every subset with less than κ elements has a model, then Σ has a model. Strongly compact cardinals are defined in a similar way without the restriction on the cardinality of the set of sentences.

== Properties ==
Every weakly compact cardinal is a reflecting cardinal, and is also a limit of reflecting cardinals. This means also that weakly compact cardinals are Mahlo cardinals, and the set of Mahlo cardinals less than a given weakly compact cardinal is stationary.

If $\kappa$ is weakly compact, then there are chains of well-founded elementary end-extensions of $(V_\kappa,\in)$ of arbitrary length $<\kappa^+$.^{p.6}

Weakly compact cardinals remain weakly compact in $L$. Assuming V = L, a cardinal is weakly compact iff it is 2-stationary.

== See also ==
- List of large cardinal properties
