= Beta-model =

Class of "well-behaved" models in set theory

In model theory, a mathematical discipline, a β-model (from the French "bon ordre", well-ordering) is a model that is correct about statements of the form "X is well-ordered". The term was introduced by Mostowski (1959) as a strengthening of the notion of ω-model. In contrast to the notation for set-theoretic properties named by ordinals, such as $\xi$-indescribability, the letter β here is only denotational.

== In analysis ==
β-models appear in the study of the reverse mathematics of subsystems of second-order arithmetic. In this context, a β-model of a subsystem of second-order arithmetic is a model M where for any Σ_{1}^{1} formula $\phi$ with parameters from M, $(\omega,M,+,\times,0,1,<)\vDash\phi$ iff $(\omega,\mathcal P(\omega),+,\times,0,1,<)\vDash\phi$.^{p. 243} Every β-model of second-order arithmetic is also an ω-model, since working within the model we can prove that < is a well-ordering, so < really is a well-ordering of the natural numbers of the model.

There is an incompleteness theorem for β-models: if T is a recursively axiomatizable theory in the language of second-order arithmetic, analogously to how there is a model of T+"there is no model of T" if there is a model of T, there is a β-model of T+"there are no countable coded β-models of T" if there is a β-model of T. A similar theorem holds for β_{n}-models for any natural number $n\geq 1$.

Axioms based on β-models provide a natural finer division of the strengths of subsystems of second-order arithmetic, and also provide a way to formulate reflection principles. For example, over $\mathsf{ATR}_0$, $\Pi^1_1\mathsf{-CA}_0$ is equivalent to the statement "for all $X$ [of second-order sort], there exists a countable β-model M such that $X\in M$.^{p. 253} (Countable ω-models are represented by their sets of integers, and their satisfaction is formalizable in the language of analysis by an inductive definition.) Also, the theory extending KP with a canonical axiom schema for a recursively Mahlo universe (often called $KPM$) is logically equivalent to the theory Δ^{1}_{2}-CA+BI+(Every true Π^{1}_{3}-formula is satisfied by a β-model of Δ^{1}_{2}-CA).

Additionally, $\mathsf{ACA}_0$ proves a connection between β-models and the hyperjump: for all sets $X$ of integers, $X$ has a hyperjump iff there exists a countable β-model $M$ such that $X\in M$.^{p. 251}

Every β-model of comprehension is elementarily equivalent to an ω-model which is not a β-model.

== In set theory ==
A notion of β-model can be defined for models of second-order set theories (such as Morse-Kelley set theory) as a model $(M, \mathcal X)$ such that the membership relations of $(M, \mathcal X)$ is well-founded, and for any relation $R\in\mathcal X$, $(M, \mathcal X)\vDash$"$R$ is well-founded" iff $R$ is in fact well-founded. While there is no least transitive model of MK, there is a least β-model of MK.^{pp. 17,154–156}
