= Potential isomorphism =

In mathematical logic and in particular in model theory, a potential isomorphism is a collection of finite partial isomorphisms between two models which satisfies certain closure conditions. Existence of a partial isomorphism entails elementary equivalence, however the converse is not generally true, but it holds for ω-saturated models.

== Definition ==
A potential isomorphism between two models M and N is a non-empty collection F of finite partial isomorphisms between M and N which satisfy the following two properties:

- for all finite partial isomorphisms Z ∈ F and for all x ∈ M there is a y ∈ N such that Z ∪ {(x,y)} ∈ F
- for all finite partial isomorphisms Z ∈ F and for all y ∈ N there is a x ∈ M such that Z ∪ {(x,y)} ∈ F

A notion of Ehrenfeucht-Fraïssé game is an exact characterisation of elementary equivalence and potential isomorphism can be seen as an approximation of it. Another notion that is similar to potential isomorphism is that of local isomorphism.
