= Paul Mahlo =

German mathematician

Friedrich Paul Mahlo (born 28 July 1883 in Coswig, Duchy of Anhalt; died 20 August 1971 in Halle, Bezirk Halle) was a German mathematician.

Mahlo introduced Mahlo cardinals in 1911. He also showed that the continuum hypothesis implies the existence of a Luzin set.

== Publications ==
- Mahlo, Paul (1908), Topologische untersuchungen über Zerlegung in Ebene und sphaerische Polygone, Halle: C. A. Kaemmerer & co. PhD dissertation
- Mahlo, Paul (1911), "Über lineare transfinite Mengen", Berichte über die Verhandlungen der Königlich Sächsischen Gesellschaft der Wissenschaften zu Leipzig. Mathematisch-Physische Klasse, 63: 187–225
- Mahlo, Paul (1912), "Zur Theorie und Anwendung der ρ_{0}-Zahlen", Berichte über die Verhandlungen der Königlich Sächsischen Gesellschaft der Wissenschaften zu Leipzig. Mathematisch-Physische Klasse, 64: 108–112
