= Strongly compact cardinal =

In set theory, a strongly compact cardinal is a certain kind of large cardinal.

An uncountable cardinal κ is strongly compact if and only if every κ-complete filter can be extended to a κ-complete ultrafilter.

Strongly compact cardinals were originally defined in terms of infinitary logic, where logical operators are allowed to take infinitely many operands. The logic on a regular cardinal κ is defined by requiring the number of operands for each operator to be less than κ; then κ is strongly compact if its logic satisfies an analog of the compactness property of finitary logic. Specifically, a statement which follows from some other collection of statements should also follow from some subcollection having cardinality less than κ.

The property of strong compactness may be weakened by only requiring this compactness property to hold when the original collection of statements has cardinality below a certain cardinal λ; we may then refer to λ-compactness. A cardinal κ is weakly compact if and only if it is κ-compact; this was the original definition of that concept.

Strong compactness implies measurability, and is implied by supercompactness. Given that the relevant cardinals exist, it is consistent with ZFC either that the first measurable cardinal is strongly compact, or that the first strongly compact cardinal is supercompact; these cannot both be true, however. A measurable limit of strongly compact cardinals is strongly compact, but the least such limit is not supercompact.

The consistency strength of strong compactness is strictly above that of a Woodin cardinal. Some set theorists conjecture that existence of a strongly compact cardinal is equiconsistent with that of a supercompact cardinal. However, a proof is unlikely until a canonical inner model theory for supercompact cardinals is developed.

Jech obtained a variant of the tree property which holds for an inaccessible cardinal if and only if it is strongly compact.

Extendibility is a second-order analog of strong compactness.

== See also ==
- List of large cardinal properties
