= Reflecting cardinal =

In set theory, a mathematical discipline, a reflecting cardinal is a cardinal number κ for which there is a normal ideal I on κ such that for every X∈I^{+}, the set of α∈κ for which X reflects at α is in I^{+}. (A stationary subset S of κ is said to reflect at α<κ if S∩α is stationary in α.) Reflecting cardinals were introduced by (Mekler & Shelah 1989).

Every weakly compact cardinal is a reflecting cardinal, and is also a limit of reflecting cardinals. The consistency strength of an inaccessible reflecting cardinal is strictly greater than a greatly Mahlo cardinal, where a cardinal κ is called greatly Mahlo if it is κ^{+}-Mahlo (Mekler & Shelah 1989). An inaccessible reflecting cardinal is not in general Mahlo however, see https://mathoverflow.net/q/212597.

== See also ==
- List of large cardinal properties

== Bibliography ==
- Jech, Thomas (2003), Set Theory, Springer Monographs in Mathematics (third millennium ed.), Berlin, New York: Springer-Verlag, p. 697, ISBN 978-3-540-44085-7
- Mekler, Alan H.; Shelah, Saharon (1989), "The consistency strength of 'every stationary set reflects'", Israel Journal of Mathematics, 67 (3): 353–366, doi:10.1007/BF02764953, ISSN 0021-2172, MR 1029909
