= Ontological maximalism =

Philosophical position

In philosophy, ontological maximalism (or metaontological maximalism) is an ontological realist position that asserts, "whatever can exist does in some sense exist".

== Overview ==
Meta-ontology deals with questions related to ontology, whether there are mind independent (objective) answers to "what exists". Ontological realism asserts that reality (at least a part of it) is independent of the human mind. In contrast to realists, ontological anti-realists deny that the world is mind-independent. Believing the epistemological and semantic problems to be insoluble, they conclude that realism must be false.

Maximalism is one of two main metaontological positions. In a maximalist framework, any entity whose existence is consistent with the nature of this world can be taken to exist.

== See also ==
- Ontology
- Large cardinal property
- Continuum hypothesis
- Mathematical universe hypothesis
- Modal realism
