= Computable measure theory =

In mathematics, computable measure theory is the part of computable analysis that deals with effective versions of measure theory. As with measure theory, this topic draws heavily from knowledge in probability theory. It is concerned with determining whether classical theorems used to determine the "size" of a set (in measure theory) can be calculated with a precisely defined algorithm, that is, one suitable for a computer.

The inability of computers to represent all real numbers (especially irrational numbers) exactly can create errors in the calculations of some classical theorems. This error cannot be truly eliminated by just increasing the size of the digits stored, and so, computable measure theory was born as a way to standardize the limits of the computer in the field of measure theory.

As of 2026, computable measure theory is still a relatively new area of study. Therefore, there are still several different approaches and definitions, with no standardized system. However, like computable theory, the work that is being done in the area is being built on top of the foundations set by Alan Turing, Andrzej Grzegorczyk and Daniel Lacombe.

Some other notable contributors include Šanin, Ko, Edalat Müller and Weihrauch.
