= Measurable cardinal =

Set theory concept

In mathematics, specifically in set theory, a measurable cardinal is a certain kind of large cardinal number. In order to define the concept, one introduces a two-valued measure on a cardinal $\kappa$, or more generally on any set. For a cardinal $\kappa$, it can be described as a subdivision of all of its subsets into large and small sets such that $\kappa$ itself is large, the empty set and all singletons $\{\alpha\}$ with $\alpha\in\kappa$ are small, complements of small sets are large and vice versa. The intersection of fewer than $\kappa$ large sets is again large.

It turns out that uncountable cardinals endowed with a two-valued measure are large cardinals whose existence cannot be proved from ZFC.

The concept of a measurable cardinal was introduced by Stanisław Ulam in 1930.

== Definition ==
Formally, a measurable cardinal is an uncountable cardinal number $\kappa$ such that there exists a $\kappa$-additive, non-trivial, 0-1-valued measure $\mu$ on the power set of $\kappa$.

Here, $\kappa$-additive means that for every $\lambda<\kappa$ and every $\lambda$-sized collection $\{A_\beta\}_{\beta<\lambda}$ of pairwise disjoint subsets $A_\beta\subseteq\kappa$, we have

$$\mu\Big(\bigcup_{\beta<\lambda}A_\beta\Big)=\sum_{\beta<\lambda}\mu(A_\beta)$$.

Equivalently, $\kappa$ is a measurable cardinal if and only if it is an uncountable cardinal with a $\kappa$-complete, non-principal ultrafilter. This means that the intersection of any strictly less than $\kappa$-many sets in the ultrafilter is also in the ultrafilter.

Equivalently, $\kappa$ is measurable if it is the critical point of a non-trivial elementary embedding of the universe $V$ into a transitive class $M$ and $^\kappa M\subseteq M$. This equivalence is due to Jerome Keisler and Dana Scott, and uses the ultrapower construction from model theory. Since $V$ is a proper class, a technical problem that is not usually present when considering ultrapowers needs to be addressed, by what is now called Scott's trick.

== Properties ==
It is trivial to note that if $\kappa$ admits a non-trivial $\kappa$-additive measure, then $\kappa$ must be regular: by non-triviality and $\kappa$-additivity, any subset of cardinality less than $\kappa$ must have measure 0, and then by $\kappa$-additivity again, this means that the entire set must not be a union of fewer than $\kappa$ sets of cardinality less than $\kappa$. Finally, if $\lambda<\kappa$ then it can't be the case that $\kappa\leq 2^\lambda$. If this were the case, we could identify $\kappa$ with some collection of 0-1 sequences of length $\lambda$. For each position in the sequence, either the subset of sequences with 1 in that position or the subset with 0 in that position would have to have measure 1. The intersection of these $\lambda$-many measure 1 subsets would thus also have to have measure 1, but it would contain exactly one sequence, which would contradict the non-triviality of the measure. Thus, assuming the axiom of choice (as the trichotomy of cardinality between κ and 2^{λ}), we can infer that $\kappa$ is a strong limit cardinal, which completes the proof of its inaccessibility.

Although it follows from ZFC that every measurable cardinal is inaccessible (and is ineffable, Ramsey, etc.), it is consistent with ZF that a measurable cardinal can be a successor cardinal. It follows from ZF + AD that $\omega_1$ is measurable, and that every subset of $\omega_1$ contains or is disjoint from a closed and unbounded subset.

Ulam showed that the smallest cardinal $\kappa$ that admits a non-trivial countably-additive two-valued measure must in fact admit a $\kappa$-additive measure. (If there were some collection of fewer than $\kappa$ measure-0 subsets whose union was $\kappa$, then the induced measure on this collection would be a counterexample to the minimality of $\kappa$.) From there, one can prove (with the axiom of choice) that the least such cardinal must be inaccessible.

If $\kappa$ is measurable and $p\in V_\kappa$ and $M$ (the ultrapower of $V$) satisfies $\psi(\kappa,p)$, then the set of $\alpha<\kappa$ such that $V$ satisfies $\psi(\alpha,p)$ is stationary in $\kappa$ (actually a set of measure 1). In particular, if $\psi$ is a $\Pi_1$ formula and $V$ satisfies $\psi(\kappa,p)$, then $M$ satisfies it and thus $V$ satisfies $\psi(\alpha,p)$ for a stationary set of $\alpha<\kappa$. This property can be used to show that $\kappa$ is a limit of most types of large cardinals that are weaker than measurable. Notice that the ultrafilter or measure witnessing that $\kappa$ is measurable cannot be in $M$ since the smallest such measurable cardinal would have to have another such below it, which is impossible.

If one starts with an elementary embedding $j_1$ of $V$ into $M_1$ with critical point $\kappa$, then one can define an ultrafilter $U$ on $\kappa$ as $\{S\subseteq\kappa \mid \kappa\in j_1(S)\}$. Then, taking an ultrapower of $V$ over $U$, we can get another elementary embedding $j_2$ of $V$ into $M_2$. However, it is important to remember that $j_2\neq j_1$. Thus, other types of large cardinals such as strong cardinals may also be measurable, but not using the same embedding. It can be shown that a strong cardinal $\kappa$ is measurable and also has $\kappa$-many measurable cardinals below it.

Every measurable cardinal $\kappa$ is a 0-huge cardinal because $^\kappa M\subseteq M$, that is, every function from $\kappa$ to $M$, is in $M$. Consequently, $V_{\kappa+1}\subseteq M$.

== Implications of existence ==
If a measurable cardinal exists, every set of reals at level $\mathbf{\Sigma}^1_2$ of the projective hierarchy is Lebesgue-measurable.

== Real-valued measurable ==
A cardinal $\kappa$ is called real-valued measurable if there is a $\kappa$-additive probability measure on the power set of $\kappa$ that vanishes on singletons. Real-valued measurable cardinals were introduced by Stefan Banach (1930). Banach & Kuratowski (1929) showed that the continuum hypothesis implies that $\mathfrak{c}$ is not real-valued measurable. Stanislaw Ulam (1930) showed (see below for parts of Ulam's proof) that real valued measurable cardinals are weakly inaccessible (they are in fact weakly Mahlo). All measurable cardinals are real-valued measurable, and a real-valued measurable cardinal $\kappa$ is measurable if and only if $\kappa$ is greater than $\mathfrak{c}$. Thus a cardinal is measurable if and only if it is real-valued measurable and strongly inaccessible. A real valued measurable cardinal less than or equal to $\mathfrak{c}$ exists if and only if there is a countably additive extension of the Lebesgue measure to all sets of real numbers if and only if there is an atomless probability measure on the power set of some non-empty set.

Solovay (1971) showed that existence of measurable cardinals in ZFC, real-valued measurable cardinals in ZFC, and measurable cardinals in ZF, are equiconsistent.

=== Weak inaccessibility of real-valued measurable cardinals ===
Let $\mu$ be an outer measure on a set $X$. Say that a cardinal number $\alpha$ is an Ulam number if whenever (Note: The notion in the article Ulam number is different.)

$\mu(X)\leq\infty$,	1

$\mu(\{x\})=0$ for every $x\in X$,	2

all $A\subseteq X$ are μ-measurable,	3

then $|X|\leq\alpha$ implies $\mu(X)=0$.

Equivalently, if $F$ is a set of pairwise disjoint subsets of $X$, $\alpha$ is an Ulam number if whenever

1. $\mu(\textstyle\bigcup F)<\infty$,
2. $\mu(A)=0$ for $A\in F$,
3. $\textstyle\bigcup G$ is $\mu$-measurable for every $G\subset F$,

then $|F|\leq\alpha$ implies $\mu(\textstyle\bigcup F)=0$.

The smallest infinite cardinal ℵ_{0} is an Ulam number. The class of Ulam numbers is closed under the cardinal successor operation. If an infinite cardinal $\beta$ has an immediate predecessor $\alpha$ that is an Ulam number, assume $\mu$ satisfies properties (1)–(3) with $X=\beta$. In the von Neumann model of ordinals and cardinals, for each $x\in\beta$, choose an injective function $f_x:x\to\alpha$ and define the sets

$$U(b,a)=\{x\in\beta\mid f_x(b)=a\}$$.

Since the functions $f_x$ are injective, the sets

$\{U(b,a)\mid b\in\beta\}$ with $a\in\alpha$ fixed

and

$\{U(b,a)\mid a\in\alpha\}$ with $b\in\beta$ fixed

are pairwise disjoint. By property (1) of $\mu$, the set

$$\{b\in\beta\mid \mu(U(b,a))>0\}$$

is countable, and hence

$$\big|\{(b,a)\in\beta\times\alpha\mid \mu(U(b,a))>0\}\big| \leq \aleph_0\cdot\alpha$$.

Thus, there is a $b_0\in\beta$ such that

$\mu(U(b_0,a))=0$ for all $a\in\alpha$,

which implies, since $\alpha$ is an Ulam number and using the second definition, that

$$\mu\Big(\bigcup_{a\in\alpha}U(b_0,a)\Big)=0$$.

If $b_0<x<\beta$ and $f_x(b_0)=a_x$ then $x\in U(b_0,a_x)$. Thus

$$\beta=b_0\cup\{b_0\}\cup \bigcup_{a\in\alpha} U(b_0,a)$$.

By property (1), $\mu(\{b_0\})=0$, and since $|b_0|\leq\alpha$, by (3), (1) and (2), $\mu(b_0)=0$. It follows that $\mu(\beta)=0$. The conclusion is that $\beta$ is an Ulam number.

There is a similar proof that the supremum of a set $S$ of Ulam numbers with $|S|$ an Ulam number is again a Ulam number. Together with the previous result, this implies that a cardinal that is not an Ulam number is weakly inaccessible.

== See also ==
- Normal measure
- Mitchell order
- List of large cardinal properties
