= Indescribable cardinal =

Large cardinal number that is hard to describe in a given language

In set theory, a branch of mathematics, a Q-indescribable cardinal is a certain kind of large cardinal number that is hard to axiomatize in some language Q. There are many different types of indescribable cardinals corresponding to different choices of languages Q. They were introduced by Hanf & Scott (1961).

A cardinal number $\kappa$ is called $\Pi^n_m$-indescribable if for every $\Pi_m$ proposition $\phi$, and set $A\subseteq V_\kappa$ with $(V_{\kappa+n},\in,A)\vDash\phi$ there exists an $\alpha<\kappa$ with $(V_{\alpha+n},\in,A\cap V_\alpha)\vDash\phi$. Following Lévy's hierarchy, here one looks at formulas with m-1 alternations of quantifiers with the outermost quantifier being universal. $\Sigma^n_m$-indescribable cardinals are defined in a similar way, but with an outermost existential quantifier. Prior to defining the structure $(V_{\kappa+n},\in,A)$, one new predicate symbol is added to the language of set theory, which is interpreted as $A$. The idea is that $\kappa$ cannot be distinguished (looking from below) from smaller cardinals by any formula of n+1-th order logic with m-1 alternations of quantifiers even with the advantage of an extra unary predicate symbol (for A). This implies that it is large because it means that there must be many smaller cardinals with similar properties.

The cardinal number $\kappa$ is called totally indescribable if it is $\Pi^n_m$-indescribable for all positive integers m and n.^{p. 59}

If $\alpha$ is an ordinal, the cardinal number $\kappa$ is called $\alpha$-indescribable if for every formula $\phi$ and every subset $U$ of $V_\kappa$ such that $\phi(U)$ holds in $V_{\kappa+\alpha}$ there is a some $\lambda<\kappa$ such that $\phi(U\cap V_\lambda)$ holds in $V_{\lambda+\alpha}$. If $\alpha$ is infinite then $\alpha$-indescribable ordinals are totally indescribable, and if $\alpha$ is finite they are the same as $\Pi^\alpha_\omega$-indescribable ordinals. There is no $\kappa$ that is $\kappa$-indescribable, nor does $\alpha$-indescribability necessarily imply $\beta$-indescribability for any $\beta<\alpha$, but there is an alternative notion of shrewd cardinals that makes sense when $\alpha\geq\kappa$: if $\phi(U,\kappa)$ holds in $V_{\kappa+\alpha}$, then there are $\lambda<\kappa$ and $\beta$ such that $\phi(U\cap V_\lambda,\lambda)$ holds in $V_{\lambda+\beta}$. However, it is possible that a cardinal $\pi$ is $\kappa$-indescribable for $\kappa$ much greater than $\pi$.^{Ch. 9, theorem 4.3}

== Historical note ==
Originally, a cardinal κ was called Q-indescribable if for every Q-formula $\phi$ and relation $A$, if $(\kappa,<,A)\vDash\phi$ then there exists an $\alpha<\kappa$ such that $(\alpha,\in,A\upharpoonright\alpha)\vDash\phi$. Using this definition, $\kappa$ is $\Pi^1_0$-indescribable iff $\kappa$ is regular and greater than $\aleph_0$.^{p.207} The cardinals $\kappa$ satisfying the above version based on the cumulative hierarchy were called strongly Q-indescribable. This property has also been referred to as "ordinal $Q$-indescribability".^{p.32}

== Equivalent conditions ==
A cardinal is $\Sigma^1_{n+1}$-indescribable iff it is $\Pi^1_n$-indescribable.^{p. 59} A cardinal is inaccessible if and only if it is $\Pi^0_n$-indescribable for all positive integers $n$, equivalently iff it is $\Pi^0_2$-indescribable, equivalently if it is $\Sigma^1_1$-indescribable.

$\Pi^1_1$-indescribable cardinals are the same as weakly compact cardinals.^{p. 59}

The indescribability condition is equivalent to $V_\kappa$ satisfying the reflection principle (which is provable in ZFC), but extended by allowing higher-order formulae with a second-order free variable.

For cardinals $\kappa<\theta$, say that an elementary embedding $j:M\to H(\theta)$ a small embedding if $M$ is transitive, $M$ is in $H(\theta)$, and $j(\textrm{crit}(j))=\kappa$. For any natural number $1\leq n$, $\kappa$ is $\Pi^1_n$-indescribable iff there is an $\alpha>\kappa$ such that for all $\theta>\alpha$ there is a small embedding $j:M\to H_\theta$ such that $H(\textrm{crit}(j)^+)^M\prec_{\Sigma_n}H(\textrm{crit}(j)^+)$.^{, Corollary 4.3}

If V=L, then for a natural number n>0, an uncountable cardinal is Π^{1}_{n}-indescribable iff it's (n+1)-stationary.

== Enforceable classes ==
For a class $X$ of ordinals and a $\Gamma$-indescribable cardinal $\kappa$, $X$ is said to be enforced at $\alpha$ (by some formula $\phi$ of $\Gamma$) if there is a $\Gamma$-formula $\phi$ and an $A\subseteq V_\kappa$ such that $(V_\kappa,\in,A)\vDash\phi$, but for no $\beta<\alpha$ with $\beta\notin X$ does $(V_\beta,\in,A\cap V_\beta)\vDash\phi$ hold.^{p.277} This gives a tool to show necessary properties of indescribable cardinals.

== Properties ==
The property of $\kappa$ being $\Pi^1_n$-indescribable is $\Pi^1_{n+1}$ over $V_\kappa$, i.e. there is a $\Pi^1_{n+1}$ sentence that $V_\kappa$ satisfies iff $\kappa$ is $\Pi^1_n$-indescribable. For $m>1$, the property of being $\Pi^m_n$-indescribable is $\Sigma^m_n$ and the property of being $\Sigma^m_n$-indescribable is $\Pi^m_n$. Thus, for $m>1$, every cardinal that is either $\Pi^m_{n+1}$-indescribable or $\Sigma^m_{n+1}$-indescribable is both $\Pi^m_n$-indescribable and $\Sigma^m_n$-indescribable and the set of such cardinals below it is stationary. The consistency strength of $\Sigma^m_n$-indescribable cardinals is below that of $\Pi^m_n$-indescribable, but for $m>1$ it is consistent with ZFC that the least $\Sigma^m_n$-indescribable exists and is above the least $\Pi^m_n$-indescribable cardinal (this is proved from consistency of ZFC with $\Pi^m_n$-indescribable cardinal and a $\Sigma^m_n$-indescribable cardinal above it).

Totally indescribable cardinals remain totally indescribable in the constructible universe^{p. 62--63} and in other canonical inner models, and similarly for $\Pi^m_n$- and $\Sigma^m_n$-indescribability.

For natural number $n$, if a cardinal $\kappa$ is $n$-indescribable, there is an ordinal $\alpha<\kappa$ such that $(V_{\alpha+n},\in)\equiv(V_{\kappa+n},\in)$, where $\equiv$ denotes elementary equivalence. For $n=0$ this is a biconditional (see Two model-theoretic characterisations of inaccessibility).

Measurable cardinals are $\Pi^2_1$-indescribable, but the smallest measurable cardinal is not $\Sigma^2_1$-indescribable.^{p. 61} However, assuming choice, there are many totally indescribable cardinals below any measurable cardinal.

For $n\geq 1$, ZFC+"there is a $\Sigma^1_n$-indescribable cardinal" is equiconsistent with ZFC+"there is a $\Sigma^1_n$-indescribable cardinal $\kappa$ such that $2^\kappa>\kappa^+$", i.e. "GCH fails at a $\Sigma^1_n$-indescribable cardinal".
