= Barwise compactness theorem =

In mathematical logic, the Barwise compactness theorem, named after Jon Barwise, is a generalization of the usual compactness theorem for first-order logic to a certain class of infinitary languages. It was stated and proved by Barwise in 1967.

== Statement ==
Let $A$ be a countable admissible set. Let $L$ be an $A$-finite relational language. Suppose $\Gamma$ is a set of $L_A$-sentences, where $\Gamma$ is a $\Sigma_1$ set with parameters from $A$, and every $A$-finite subset of $\Gamma$ is satisfiable. Then $\Gamma$ is satisfiable.
