= Huge cardinal =

Large cardinal from set theory

In mathematics, a cardinal number $\kappa$ is called huge if there exists an elementary embedding $j : V \to M$ from $V$ into a transitive inner model $M$ with critical point $\kappa$ and

$${}^{j(\kappa)}M \subset M.$$

Here, ${}^\alpha M$ is the class of all sequences of length $\alpha$ whose elements are in $M$.

Huge cardinals were introduced by Kenneth Kunen (1978).

== Variants ==
In what follows, $j^n$ refers to the $n$-th iterate of the elementary embedding $j$, that is, $j$ composed with itself $n$ times, for a finite ordinal $n$. Also, ${}^{<\alpha}M$ is the class of all sequences of length less than $\alpha$ whose elements are in $M$. Notice that for the "super" versions, $\gamma$ should be less than $j(\kappa)$, not ${j^n(\kappa)}$.

κ is almost n-huge if and only if there is $j : V \to M$ with critical point $\kappa$ and

$${}^{<j^n(\kappa)}M \subset M.$$

In particular, κ is said to be almost huge when it is almost 1-huge.

κ is super almost n-huge if and only if for every ordinal γ there is $j : V \to M$ with critical point $\kappa$, $\gamma< j(\kappa)$, and

$${}^{<j^n(\kappa)}M \subset M.$$

κ is n-huge if and only if there is $j : V \to M$ with critical point $\kappa$ and

$${}^{j^n(\kappa)}M \subset M.$$

κ is super n-huge if and only if for every ordinal $\gamma$ there is $j : V \to M$ with critical point $\kappa$, $\gamma< j(\kappa)$, and

$${}^{j^n(\kappa)}M \subset M.$$

Notice that 0-huge is the same as measurable cardinal; and 1-huge is the same as huge. A cardinal satisfying one of the rank into rank axioms is $n$-huge for all finite $n$.

The existence of an almost huge cardinal implies that Vopěnka's principle is consistent; more precisely any almost huge cardinal is also a Vopěnka cardinal.

Kanamori, Reinhardt, and Solovay defined seven large cardinal properties between extendibility and hugeness in strength, named $\mathbf A_2(\kappa)$ through $\mathbf A_7(\kappa)$, and a property $\mathbf A_6^\ast(\kappa)$. The additional property $\mathbf A_1(\kappa)$ is equivalent to "$\kappa$ is huge", and $\mathbf A_3(\kappa)$ is equivalent to "$\kappa$ is almost huge". Corazza introduced the property $A_{3.5}$, lying strictly between $A_3$ and $A_4$.

== Consistency strength ==
The cardinals are arranged in order of increasing consistency strength as follows:

- almost $n$-huge
- super almost $n$-huge
- $n$-huge
- super $n$-huge
- almost $n+1$-huge

The consistency of a huge cardinal implies the consistency of a supercompact cardinal, nevertheless, the least huge cardinal is smaller than the least supercompact cardinal (assuming both exist).

== ω-huge cardinals ==
One can try defining an $\omega$-huge cardinal $\kappa$ as one such that an elementary embedding $j : V \to M$ from $V$ into a transitive inner model $M$ with critical point $\kappa$ and ${}^\lambda M\subseteq M$, where $\lambda$ is the supremum of $j^n(\kappa)$ for positive integers $n$. However Kunen's inconsistency theorem shows that such cardinals are inconsistent in ZFC, though it is still open whether they are consistent in ZF. Instead an $\omega$-huge cardinal $\kappa$ is defined as the critical point of an elementary embedding from some rank $V_{\lambda+1}$ to itself. This is closely related to the rank-into-rank axiom I_{1}.

== See also ==
- List of large cardinal properties
- The Dehornoy order on a braid group was motivated by properties of huge cardinals.
