= Normal measure =

In set theory, a normal measure is a measure on a measurable cardinal $\kappa$ such that the equivalence class of the identity function on $\kappa$ maps to $\kappa$ itself in the ultrapower construction. Equivalently, a measure $\mu$ on $\kappa$ is normal iff whenever $f:\kappa\to\kappa$ is such that $f(\alpha)<\alpha$ for $\mu$-many $\alpha<\kappa$, then there is a $\beta<\kappa$ such that $f(\alpha)=\beta$ for $\mu$-many $\alpha<\kappa$. (Here, "$\mu$-many" means that the set of elements of $\kappa$ where the property holds is a member of the ultrafilter, i.e. has measure 1 in $\mu$.) Also equivalent, the ultrafilter (set of sets with measure 1) is closed under diagonal intersection.

For a normal measure $\mu$, any closed unbounded (club) subset of $\kappa$ contains $\mu$-many ordinals less than $\kappa$ and any subset containing $\mu$-many ordinals less than $\kappa$ is stationary in $\kappa$.

If an uncountable cardinal $\kappa$ has a measure on it, then it has a normal measure on it.
