= Subtle cardinal =

In mathematics, subtle cardinals and ethereal cardinals are closely related kinds of large cardinal number.

A cardinal $\kappa$ is called subtle if for every closed and unbounded $C\subset\kappa$ and for every sequence $(A_\delta)_{\delta<\kappa}$ of length $\kappa$ such that $A_\delta\subset\delta$ for all $\delta<\kappa$ (where $A_\delta$ is the $\delta$th element), there exist $\alpha,\beta$, belonging to $C$, with $\alpha<\beta$, such that $A_\alpha=A_\beta\cap\alpha$.

A cardinal $\kappa$ is called ethereal if for every closed and unbounded $C\subset\kappa$ and for every sequence $(A_\delta)_{\delta<\kappa}$ of length $\kappa$ such that $A_\delta\subset\delta$ and $A_\delta$ has the same cardinality as $\delta$ for arbitrary $\delta<\kappa$, there exist $\alpha,\beta$, belonging to $C$, with $\alpha<\beta$, such that $\textrm{card}(\alpha)=\mathrm{card}(A_\beta\cup A_\alpha)$.

Subtle cardinals were introduced by Jensen & Kunen (1969). Ethereal cardinals were introduced by Ketonen (1974). Any subtle cardinal is ethereal,^{p. 388} and any strongly inaccessible ethereal cardinal is subtle.^{p. 391}

== Characterizations ==
Some equivalent properties to subtlety are known.

=== Relationship to Vopěnka's Principle ===
Subtle cardinals are equivalent to a weak form of Vopěnka cardinals. Namely, an inaccessible cardinal $\kappa$ is subtle if and only if in $V_{\kappa+1}$, any logic has stationarily many weak compactness cardinals.

Vopěnka's principle itself may be stated as the existence of a strong compactness cardinal for each logic.

=== Chains in transitive sets ===
There is a subtle cardinal $\leq\kappa$ if and only if every transitive set $S$ of cardinality $\kappa$ contains $x$ and $y$ such that $x$ is a proper subset of $y$ and $x\neq\varnothing$ and $x\neq\{\varnothing\}$.^{Corollary 2.6} If a cardinal $\lambda$ is subtle, then for every $\alpha<\lambda$, every transitive set $S$ of cardinality $\lambda$ includes a chain (under inclusion) of order type $\alpha$.^{Theorem 2.2}

== Extensions ==
A hypersubtle cardinal is a subtle cardinal which has a stationary set of subtle cardinals below it.^{p.1014}

== See also ==
- List of large cardinal properties
