= Rank-into-rank =

Large cardinal property in set theory

In set theory, a branch of mathematics, a rank-into-rank embedding is a large cardinal property defined by one of the following four axioms given in order of increasing consistency strength. (A set of rank $< \lambda$ is one of the elements of the set $V_\lambda$ of the von Neumann hierarchy.)

- Axiom I3: There is a nontrivial elementary embedding of $V_\lambda$ into itself.
- Axiom I2: There is a nontrivial elementary embedding of $V$ into a transitive class $M$ that includes $V_\lambda$ where $\lambda$ is the first fixed point above the critical point.
- Axiom I1: There is a nontrivial elementary embedding of $V_{\lambda+1}$ into itself.
- Axiom I0: There is a nontrivial elementary embedding of $L(V_{\lambda+1})$ into itself with critical point below $\lambda$. I0 is the strongest of these.

These are essentially the strongest known large cardinal axioms not known to be inconsistent in ZFC; the axiom for Reinhardt cardinals is stronger, but is not consistent with the axiom of choice.

If $j$ is the elementary embedding mentioned in one of these axioms and $\kappa$ is its critical point, then $\lambda$ is the limit of $j^n(\kappa)$ as $n$ goes to $\omega$. More generally, if the axiom of choice holds, it is provable that if there is a nontrivial elementary embedding of $V_\alpha$ into itself then $\alpha$ is either a limit ordinal of cofinality $\omega$ or the successor of such an ordinal.

The axioms I0, I1, I2, and I3 were at first suspected to be inconsistent (in ZFC) as it was thought possible that Kunen's inconsistency theorem that Reinhardt cardinals are inconsistent with the axiom of choice could be extended to them (which is why they are denoted with "I" for "inconsistency"), but this has not yet happened and they are now usually believed to be consistent.

Every I0 cardinal $\kappa$ (speaking here of the critical point of $j$) is an I1 cardinal.

Every I1 cardinal $\kappa$ (sometimes called ω-huge cardinals) is an I2 cardinal and has a stationary set of I2 cardinals below it.

Every I2 cardinal $\kappa$ is an I3 cardinal and has a stationary set of I3 cardinals below it.

Every I3 cardinal $\kappa$ has another I3 cardinal above it and is an $n$-huge cardinal for every $n< \omega$.

Axiom I1 implies that $V_{\lambda+1}$ (equivalently, $H(\lambda^+)$) does not satisfy V=HOD. There is no set $S\subset\lambda$ definable in $V_{\lambda+1}$ (even from parameters in $V_\lambda$ and ordinals $<\lambda^+$) with $S$ cofinal in $\lambda$ and $\vert S\vert<\lambda$, that is, no such $S$ witnesses that $\lambda$ is singular even though it has cofinality ω. And similarly for Axiom I0 and ordinal definability in $L(V_{\lambda+1})$ (even from parameters in $V_\lambda$). However globally, and even in $V_\lambda$, V=HOD is relatively consistent with Axiom I1.

Notice that I0 is sometimes strengthened further by adding an "Icarus set", so that it would be

- Axiom Icarus set: There is a nontrivial elementary embedding of $L(V_{\lambda+1}, \mathrm{Icarus})$ into itself with the critical point below $\lambda$.

The Icarus set should be in $V_{\lambda+1} \smallsetminus L(V_{\lambda+1})$ but chosen to avoid creating an inconsistency. So for example, it cannot encode a well-ordering of $V_{\lambda+1}$. See section 10 of Dimonte for more details.

Woodin defined a sequence of sets $E_\alpha(V_{\lambda+1})$ for use as Icarus sets.
