= Peter Koellner =

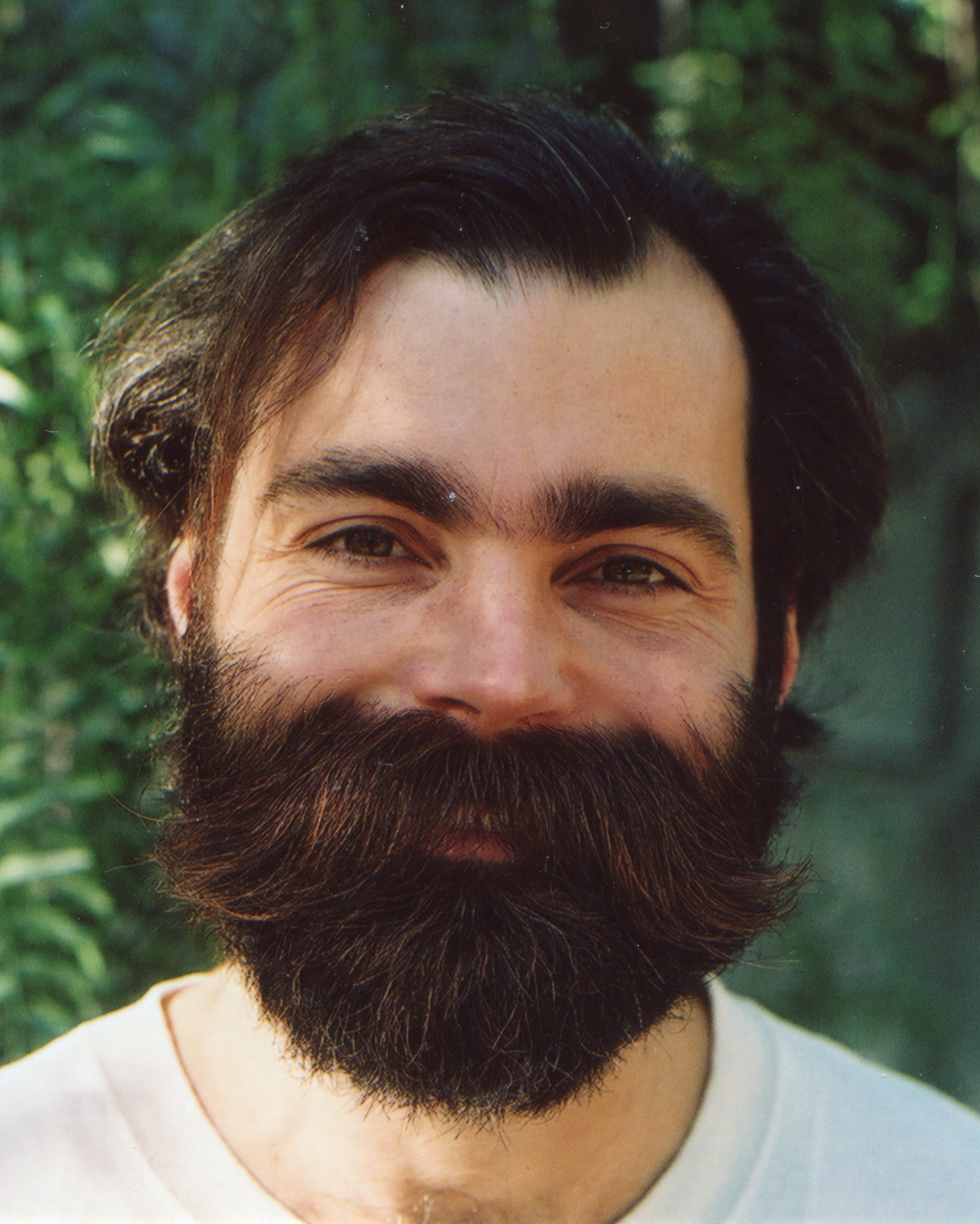
Koellner in 2006

Peter Koellner is professor of philosophy at Harvard University. He received his Ph.D. from MIT in 2003. His main areas of research are mathematical logic, specifically set theory, and philosophy of mathematics, philosophy of physics, analytic philosophy, and philosophy of language.

In 2008 Koellner was awarded a Kurt Gödel Centenary Research Prize Fellowship. Currently, Koellner serves on the American Philosophical Association's Advisory Committee to the Eastern Division Program Committee in the area of Logic.

According to a review by Pierre Matet on Zentralblatt MATH, his joint paper with Hugh Woodin Incompatible Ω-Complete Theories contains an illuminating discussion of the issues involved, which makes it recommended reading for anyone interested in modern set theory.

== Papers ==
- On the Question of Absolute Undecidability, Philosophia Mathematica (III) 14 (2006)
- On Reflection Principles, Annals of Pure and Applied Logic, Volume 157, Issues 2-3, February 2009, Pages 206-219, Kurt Gödel Centenary Research Prize Fellowships
- Incompatible Ω-Complete Theories (with Hugh Woodin), Journal of Symbolic Logic, Volume 74, Issue 4 (2009), 1155-1170..
- Koellner, P., Woodin, W.H. (2010). Large Cardinals from Determinacy. In: Foreman, M., Kanamori, A. (eds) Handbook of Set Theory. Springer, Dordrecht. https://doi.org/10.1007/978-1-4020-5764-9_24
- Koellner P., Strong Logics of First and Second Order. The Bulletin of Symbolic Logic. 2010;16(1):1-36. doi:10.2178/bsl/1264433796
- Truth in Mathematics: The Question of Pluralism (to appear in New Waves in Philosophy of Mathematics)
