= Supercompact cardinal =

Large cardinal from set theory

In set theory, a supercompact cardinal is a type of large cardinal independently introduced by Solovay and Reinhardt. They display a variety of reflection properties.

== Formal definition ==
If $\lambda$ is any ordinal, $\kappa$ is $\lambda$-supercompact means that there exists an elementary embedding $j$ from the universe $V$ into a transitive inner model $M$ with critical point $\kappa$, $j(\kappa)>\lambda$ and

$${ }^\lambda M\subseteq M \,.$$

That is, $M$ contains all of its $\lambda$-sequences. Then $\kappa$ is supercompact means that it is $\lambda$-supercompact for all ordinals $\lambda$.

Alternatively, an uncountable cardinal $\kappa$ is supercompact if for every $A$ such that $\vert A\vert\geq\kappa$ there exists a normal measure over $[A]^{<\kappa}$, in the following sense.

$[A]^{<\kappa}$ is defined as follows:

$$[A]^{<\kappa} := \{x \subseteq A\mid \vert x\vert < \kappa\}$$.

An ultrafilter $U$ over $[A]^{<\kappa}$ is fine if it is $\kappa$-complete and $\{x \in [A]^{<\kappa}\mid a \in x\} \in U$, for every $a \in A$. A normal measure over $[A]^{<\kappa}$ is a fine ultrafilter $U$ over $[A]^{<\kappa}$ with the additional property that every function $f:[A]^{<\kappa} \to A$ such that $\{x \in [A]^{<\kappa}| f(x)\in x\} \in U$ is constant on a set in $U$. Here "constant on a set in $U$" means that there is $a \in A$ such that $\{x \in [A]^{< \kappa}| f(x)= a\} \in U$.

== Properties ==
Supercompact cardinals have reflection properties. If a cardinal with some property (say a 3-huge cardinal) that is witnessed by a structure of limited rank exists above a supercompact cardinal $\kappa$, then a cardinal with that property exists below $\kappa$. For example, if $\kappa$ is supercompact and the generalized continuum hypothesis (GCH) holds below $\kappa$ then it holds everywhere because a bijection between the powerset of $\nu$ and a cardinal at least $\nu^{++}$ would be a witness of limited rank for the failure of GCH at $\nu$ so it would also have to exist below $\nu$.

Finding a canonical inner model for supercompact cardinals is one of the major problems of inner model theory.

The least supercompact cardinal is the least $\kappa$ such that for every structure $(M,R_1,\ldots,R_n)$ with cardinality of the domain $\vert M\vert\geq\kappa$, and for every $\Pi_1^1$ sentence $\phi$ such that $(M,R_1,\ldots,R_n)\vDash\phi$, there exists a substructure $(M',R_1\vert M,\ldots,R_n\vert M)$ with smaller domain (i.e. $\vert M'\vert<\vert M\vert$) that satisfies $\phi$.

Supercompactness has a combinatorial characterization similar to the property of being ineffable. Let $P_\kappa(A)$ be the set of all nonempty subsets of $A$ which have cardinality $<\kappa$. A cardinal $\kappa$ is supercompact iff for every set $A$ (equivalently every cardinal $\alpha$), for every function $f:P_\kappa(A)\to P_\kappa(A)$, if $f(X)\subseteq X$ for all $X\in P_\kappa(A)$, then there is some $B\subseteq A$ such that $\{X\mid f(X)=B\cap X\}$ is stationary (in \(P_\kappa(A)\)).

Magidor obtained a variant of the tree property which holds for an inaccessible cardinal if it is supercompact.

== See also ==
- Indestructibility
- Strongly compact cardinal
- List of large cardinal properties
