= Mahlo cardinal =

Type of large transfinite number

In mathematics, a Mahlo cardinal is a certain kind of large cardinal number. Mahlo cardinals were first described by Paul Mahlo (1911, 1912, 1913). As with all large cardinals, none of these varieties of Mahlo cardinals can be proven to exist by ZFC (assuming ZFC is consistent).

A cardinal number $\kappa$ is called strongly Mahlo if $\kappa$ is strongly inaccessible and the set $U = \{\lambda<\kappa \mid \lambda\text{ is strongly inaccessible}\}$ is stationary in $\kappa$. In other words, $\kappa$ is strongly inaccessible, and for any unbounded set $S\subseteq\kappa$ of cardinals, there is a strongly inaccessible cardinal $\lambda < \kappa$ which is a limit of members of $S$.

A cardinal $\kappa$ is called weakly Mahlo if $\kappa$ is weakly inaccessible and the set of weakly inaccessible cardinals less than $\kappa$ is stationary in $\kappa$.

The term "Mahlo cardinal" now usually means "strongly Mahlo cardinal", though the cardinals originally considered by Mahlo were weakly Mahlo cardinals.

== Minimal condition sufficient for a Mahlo cardinal ==
- If κ is a limit ordinal and the set of regular ordinals less than κ is stationary in κ, then κ is weakly Mahlo.

The main difficulty in proving this is to show that κ is regular. We will suppose that it is not regular and construct a club set which gives us a μ such that:

μ = cf(μ) < cf(κ) < μ < κ which is a contradiction.

If κ were not regular, then cf(κ) < κ. We could choose a strictly increasing and continuous cf(κ)-sequence which begins with cf(κ)+1 and has κ as its limit. The limits of that sequence would be club in κ. So there must be a regular μ among those limits. So μ is a limit of an initial subsequence of the cf(κ)-sequence. Thus its cofinality is less than the cofinality of κ and greater than it at the same time; which is a contradiction. Thus the assumption that κ is not regular must be false, i.e. κ is regular.

No stationary set can exist below $\aleph_0$ with the required property because {2,3,4,...} is club in ω but contains no regular ordinals; so κ is uncountable. And it is a regular limit of regular cardinals; so it is weakly inaccessible. Then one uses the set of uncountable limit cardinals below κ as a club set to show that the stationary set may be assumed to consist of weak inaccessibles.

- If κ is weakly Mahlo and also a strong limit, then κ is Mahlo.

κ is weakly inaccessible and a strong limit, so it is strongly inaccessible.

We show that the set of uncountable strong limit cardinals below κ is club in κ. Let μ_{0} be the larger of the threshold and ω_{1}. For each finite n, let μ_{n+1} = 2^{μ_{n}} which is less than κ because it is a strong limit cardinal. Then their limit is a strong limit cardinal and is less than κ by its regularity. The limits of uncountable strong limit cardinals are also uncountable strong limit cardinals. So the set of them is club in κ. Intersect that club set with the stationary set of weakly inaccessible cardinals less than κ to get a stationary set of strongly inaccessible cardinals less than κ.

== Example: showing that Mahlo cardinals κ are κ-inaccessible (hyper-inaccessible) ==
The term "hyper-inaccessible" is ambiguous. In this section, a cardinal κ is called hyper-inaccessible if it is κ-inaccessible (as opposed to the more common meaning of 1-inaccessible).

Suppose κ is Mahlo. We proceed by transfinite induction on α to show that κ is α-inaccessible for any α ≤ κ. Since κ is Mahlo, κ is inaccessible; and thus 0-inaccessible, which is the same thing.

If κ is α-inaccessible, then there are β-inaccessibles (for β < α) arbitrarily close to κ. Consider the set of simultaneous limits of such β-inaccessibles larger than some threshold but less than κ. It is unbounded in κ (imagine rotating through β-inaccessibles for β < α ω-times choosing a larger cardinal each time, then take the limit which is less than κ by regularity (this is what fails if α ≥ κ)). It is closed, so it is club in κ. So, by κ's Mahlo-ness, it contains an inaccessible. That inaccessible is actually an α-inaccessible. So κ is α+1-inaccessible.

If λ ≤ κ is a limit ordinal and κ is α-inaccessible for all α < λ, then every β < λ is also less than α for some α < λ. So this case is trivial. In particular, κ is κ-inaccessible and thus hyper-inaccessible.

To show that κ is a limit of hyper-inaccessibles and thus 1-hyper-inaccessible, we need to show that the diagonal set of cardinals μ < κ which are α-inaccessible for every α < μ is club in κ. Choose a 0-inaccessible above the threshold, call it α_{0}. Then pick an α_{0}-inaccessible, call it α_{1}. Keep repeating this and taking limits at limits until you reach a fixed point, call it μ. Then μ has the required property (being a simultaneous limit of α-inaccessibles for all α < μ) and is less than κ by regularity. Limits of such cardinals also have the property, so the set of them is club in κ. By Mahlo-ness of κ, there is an inaccessible in this set and it is hyper-inaccessible. So κ is 1-hyper-inaccessible. We can intersect this same club set with the stationary set less than κ to get a stationary set of hyper-inaccessibles less than κ.

The rest of the proof that κ is α-hyper-inaccessible mimics the proof that it is α-inaccessible. So κ is hyper-hyper-inaccessible, etc..

== α-Mahlo, hyper-Mahlo and greatly Mahlo cardinals ==
The term α-Mahlo is ambiguous and different authors give inequivalent definitions. One definition is that a cardinal κ is called α-Mahlo for some ordinal α if κ is strongly inaccessible and for every ordinal β<α, the set of β-Mahlo cardinals below κ is stationary in κ.^{p. 3} However the condition "κ is strongly inaccessible" is sometimes replaced by other conditions, such as "κ is regular" or "κ is weakly inaccessible" or "κ is Mahlo". We can define "hyper-Mahlo", "α-hyper-Mahlo", "hyper-hyper-Mahlo", "weakly α-Mahlo", "weakly hyper-Mahlo", "weakly α-hyper-Mahlo", and so on, by analogy with the definitions for inaccessibles, so for example a cardinal κ is called hyper-Mahlo if it is κ-Mahlo.

A regular uncountable cardinal κ is greatly Mahlo if and only if there is a normal (i.e. nontrivial and closed under diagonal intersections) κ-complete filter on the power set of κ that is closed under the Mahlo operation, which maps the set of ordinals S to {α$\in$S: α has uncountable cofinality and S∩α is stationary in α}

For α < κ^{+}, define the subsets M_{α}(κ) ⊆ κ inductively as follows:

- M_{0}(κ) is the set of regular cardinals below κ,
- M_{α+1}(κ) is the set of regular λ < κ such that M_{α}(κ) ∩ λ is stationary in λ,
- for limits α with cf(α) < κ, M_{α}(κ) is the intersection of M_{β}(κ) over all β < α, and
- for limits α with cf(α) = κ, pick an enumeration f : κ → α of a cofinal subset. Then, M_{α}(κ) is the set of all λ < κ such that λ ∈ M_{f(γ)}(κ) for all γ < λ.

Although the exact definition depends on a choice of cofinal subset for each α < κ^{+} of cofinality κ, any choice will give the same sequence of subsets modulo the nonstationary ideal.

For δ ≤ κ^{+}, κ is then called δ-Mahlo if and only if M_{α}(κ) is stationary in κ for all α < δ. A cardinal κ is κ^{+}-Mahlo if and only if it is greatly Mahlo.

The properties of being inaccessible, Mahlo, weakly Mahlo, α-Mahlo, greatly Mahlo, etc. are preserved if we replace the universe by an inner model.

Every reflecting cardinal has strictly more consistency strength than a greatly Mahlo, but inaccessible reflecting cardinals aren't in general Mahlo.

== The Mahlo operation ==
If X is a class of ordinals, then we can form a new class of ordinals M(X) consisting of the ordinals α of uncountable cofinality such that α∩X is stationary in α. This operation M is called the Mahlo operation. It can be used to define Mahlo cardinals: for example, if X is the class of regular cardinals, then M(X) is the class of weakly Mahlo cardinals. The condition that α has uncountable cofinality ensures that the closed unbounded subsets of α are closed under intersection and so form a filter; in practice the elements of X often already have uncountable cofinality in which case this condition is redundant. Some authors add the condition that α is in X, which in practice usually makes little difference as it is often automatically satisfied.

For a fixed regular uncountable cardinal κ, the Mahlo operation induces an operation on the Boolean algebra of all subsets of κ modulo the non-stationary ideal.

The Mahlo operation can be iterated transfinitely as follows:

- M^{0}(X) = X
- M^{α+1}(X) = M(M^{α}(X))
- If α is a limit ordinal then M^{α}(X) is the intersection of M^{β}(X) for β<α

These iterated Mahlo operations produce the classes of α-Mahlo cardinals starting with the class of strongly inaccessible cardinals.

It is also possible to diagonalize this process by defining

- M^{Δ}(X) is the set of ordinals α that are in M^{β}(X) for β<α.

And of course this diagonalization process can be iterated too. The diagonalized Mahlo operation produces the hyper-Mahlo cardinals, and so on.

== Mahlo cardinals and reflection principles ==
Axiom F is the statement that every normal function on the ordinals has a regular fixed point. (This is not a first-order axiom as it quantifies over all normal functions, so it can be considered either as a second-order axiom or as an axiom scheme.) A cardinal is called Mahlo if every normal function on it has a regular fixed point, so axiom F is in some sense saying that the class of all ordinals is Mahlo. A cardinal κ is Mahlo if and only if a second-order form of axiom F holds in V_{κ}. Axiom F is in turn equivalent to the statement that for any formula φ with parameters there are arbitrarily large inaccessible ordinals α such that V_{α} reflects φ (in other words φ holds in V_{α} if and only if it holds in the whole universe) (Drake 1974, chapter 4).

== Appearance in Borel diagonalization ==
Harvey Friedman (1981) has shown that existence of Mahlo cardinals is a necessary assumption in a sense to prove certain theorems about Borel functions on products of the closed unit interval.

Let $Q$ be $[0,1]^\omega$, the $\omega$-fold iterated Cartesian product of the closed unit interval with itself. The group $(H,\cdot)$ of all permutations of $\mathbb N$ that move only finitely many natural numbers can be seen as acting on $Q$ by permuting coordinates. The group action $\cdot$ also acts diagonally on any of the products $Q^n$, by defining an abuse of notation $g\cdot(x_1,\ldots,x_n)=(g\cdot x_1,\ldots, g\cdot x_n)$. For $x,y\in Q^n$, let $x\sim y$ if $x$ and are in the same orbit under this diagonal action.

Let $F:Q\times Q^n\to [0,1]$ be a Borel function such that for any $x\in Q^n$ and $y,z\in Q$, if $y\sim z$ then $F(x,y)=F(x,z)$. Then there is a sequence $(x_k)_{0\leq k\leq m}$ such that for all sequences of indices $s<t_1<\ldots<t_n\leq m$, $F(x_s,(x_{t_1},\ldots,x_{t_n}))$ is the first coordinate of $x_{s+1}$. This theorem is provable in $ZFC+\forall(n<\omega)\exists\kappa(\kappa\; \textrm{is}\; n\textrm{-Mahlo})$, but not in any theory $ZFC+\exists\kappa(\kappa\; \textrm{is}\; n\textrm{-Mahlo})$ for some fixed $n<\omega$.
