= Infinitary logic =

Logic that allows infinitely long proofs

An infinitary logic is a logic that allows infinitely long statements and/or infinitely long proofs. The concept was introduced by Zermelo in the 1930s.

Some infinitary logics may have different properties from those of standard first-order logic. In particular, infinitary logics may fail to be compact or complete. Notions of compactness and completeness that are equivalent in finitary logic sometimes are not so in infinitary logics. Therefore for infinitary logics, notions of strong compactness and strong completeness are defined. This article addresses Hilbert-type infinitary logics, as these have been extensively studied and constitute the most straightforward extensions of finitary logic. These are not, however, the only infinitary logics that have been formulated or studied.

Considering whether a certain infinitary logic named Ω-logic is complete promises to throw light on the continuum hypothesis.

== A word on notation and the axiom of choice ==
As a language with infinitely long formulae is being presented, it is not possible to write such formulae down explicitly. To get around this problem a number of notational conveniences, which, strictly speaking, are not part of the formal language, are used. $\cdots$ is used to point out an expression that is infinitely long. Where it is unclear, the length of the sequence is noted afterwards. Where this notation becomes ambiguous or confusing, suffixes such as $\bigvee_{\gamma < \delta}{A_{\gamma}}$ are used to indicate an infinite disjunction over a set of formulae of cardinality $\delta$. The same notation may be applied to quantifiers, for example $\forall_{\gamma < \delta}{V_{\gamma}:}$. This is meant to represent an infinite sequence of quantifiers: a quantifier for each $V_{\gamma}$ where $\gamma < \delta$.

All usage of suffixes and $\cdots$ are not part of formal infinitary languages.

The axiom of choice is assumed (as is often done when discussing infinitary logic) as this is necessary to have sensible distributivity laws.

== Formal languages ==
A first-order infinitary language $L_{\kappa,\lambda}$, $\kappa$ regular, $\lambda = 0$ or $\omega\leq\lambda\leq\kappa$, has the same set of symbols as a finitary logic and may use all the rules for formation of formulae of a finitary logic together with some additional ones:

- Given a set of formulae $A=\{A_\gamma | \gamma < \delta <\alpha \}$ with $|\alpha| < \kappa$ then $(A_0 \lor A_1 \lor \cdots)$ and $(A_0 \land A_1 \land \cdots)$ are formulae. (In each case the sequence has length $\delta$.)
- Given a set of variables $V=\{V_\gamma | \gamma< \delta < \beta \}$ with $|\beta| < \lambda$ and a formula $A_0$ then $\forall V_0 :\forall V_1 \cdots (A_0)$ and $\exists V_0 :\exists V_1 \cdots (A_0)$ are formulae. (In each case the sequence of quantifiers has length $\delta$.)

The language may also have function, relation, and predicate symbols of finite arity. Karp also defined languages $L_{\kappa\,\lambda\omicron\pi}$ with $\pi\leq\kappa$ an infinite cardinal and some more complicated restrictions on $\omicron$ that allow for function and predicate symbols of infinite arity, with $\omicron$ controlling the maximum arity of a function symbol and $\pi$ controlling predicate symbols.

The concepts of free and bound variables apply in the same manner to infinite formulae. Just as in finitary logic, a formula all of whose variables are bound is referred to as a sentence.

== Definition of Hilbert-type infinitary logics ==
A theory $T$ in infinitary language $L_{\alpha , \beta}$ is a set of sentences in the logic. A proof in infinitary logic from a theory $T$ is a (possibly infinite) sequence of statements that obeys the following conditions: Each statement is either a logical axiom, an element of $T$, or is deduced from previous statements using a rule of inference. As before, all rules of inference in finitary logic can be used, together with an additional one:

- Given a set of statements $A=\{A_\gamma | \gamma < \delta <\alpha \}$ that have occurred previously in the proof then the statement $\land_{\gamma < \delta}{A_{\gamma}}$ can be inferred.

If $\beta<\alpha$, forming universal closures may not always be possible, however extra constant symbols may be added for each variable with the resulting satisfiability relation remaining the same. To avoid this, some authors use a different definition of the language $L_{\alpha,\beta}$ forbidding formulas from having more than $\beta$ free variables.

The logical axiom schemata specific to infinitary logic are presented below. Global schemata variables: $\delta$ and $\gamma$ such that $0 < \delta < \alpha$.

- $((\land_{\epsilon < \delta}{(A_{\delta} \implies A_{\epsilon})}) \implies (A_{\delta} \implies \land_{\epsilon < \delta}{A_{\epsilon}}))$
- For each $\gamma < \delta$, $((\land_{\epsilon < \delta}{A_{\epsilon}}) \implies A_{\gamma})$
- Chang's distributivity laws (for each $\gamma$): $(\lor_{\mu < \gamma}{(\land_{\delta < \gamma}{A_{\mu , \delta}})})$, where $\forall \mu \forall \delta \exists \epsilon < \gamma: A_{\mu , \delta} = A_{\epsilon}$ or $A_{\mu , \delta} = \neg A_{\epsilon}$, and $\forall g \in \gamma^{\gamma} \exists \epsilon < \gamma: \{A_{\epsilon} , \neg A_{\epsilon}\} \subseteq \{A_{\mu , g(\mu)} : \mu < \gamma\}$
- For $\gamma < \alpha$, $((\land_{\mu < \gamma}{(\lor_{\delta < \gamma}{A_{\mu , \delta}})}) \implies (\lor_{\epsilon < \gamma^{\gamma}}{(\land_{\mu < \gamma}{A_{\mu ,\gamma_{\epsilon}(\mu)})}}))$, where $\{\gamma_{\epsilon}: \epsilon < \gamma^{\gamma}\}$ is a well ordering of $\gamma^{\gamma}$

The last two axiom schemata require the axiom of choice because certain sets must be well orderable. The last axiom schema is strictly speaking unnecessary, as Chang's distributivity laws imply it, however it is included as a natural way to allow natural weakenings to the logic.

== Completeness, compactness, and strong completeness ==
A theory is any set of sentences. The truth of statements in models are defined by recursion and will agree with the definition for finitary logic where both are defined. Given a theory T a sentence is said to be valid for the theory T if it is true in all models of T.

A logic in the language $L_{\alpha , \beta}$ is complete if for every sentence S valid in every model there exists a proof of S. It is strongly complete if for any theory T for every sentence S valid in T there is a proof of S from T. An infinitary logic can be complete without being strongly complete.

A cardinal $\kappa \neq \omega$ is weakly compact when for every theory T in $L_{\kappa , \kappa}$ containing at most $\kappa$ many formulas, if every S $\subseteq$ T of cardinality less than $\kappa$ has a model, then T has a model. A cardinal $\kappa \neq \omega$ is strongly compact when for every theory T in $L_{\kappa , \kappa}$, without restriction on size, if every S $\subseteq$ T of cardinality less than $\kappa$ has a model, then T has a model.

== Concepts expressible in infinitary logic ==
In the language of set theory the following statement expresses foundation:

$$\forall_{\gamma < \omega}{V_{\gamma}:} \neg \land_{\gamma < \omega}{V_{\gamma +} \in V_{\gamma}}.\,$$

Unlike the axiom of foundation, this statement admits no non-standard interpretations. The concept of well-foundedness can only be expressed in a logic that allows infinitely many quantifiers in an individual statement. As a consequence many theories, including Peano arithmetic, which cannot be properly axiomatised in finitary logic, can be in a suitable infinitary logic. Other examples include the theories of non-archimedean fields and torsion-free groups. These three theories can be defined without the use of infinite quantification; only infinite junctions are needed.

Truth predicates for countable languages are definable in $\mathcal L_{\omega_1,\omega}$.

== Complete infinitary logics ==
Two infinitary logics stand out in their completeness. These are the logics of $L_{\omega , \omega}$ and $L_{\omega_1 , \omega}$. The former is standard finitary first-order logic and the latter is an infinitary logic that only allows statements of countable size.

The logic of $L_{\omega , \omega}$ is also strongly complete, compact and strongly compact.

The logic of $L_{\omega_1, \omega}$ fails to be compact, but it is complete (under the axioms given above). Moreover, it satisfies a variant of the Craig interpolation property.

If the logic of $L_{\alpha, \alpha}$ is strongly complete (under the axioms given above) then $\alpha$ is strongly compact (because proofs in these logics cannot use $\alpha$ or more of the given axioms).

== Sources ==
- Karp, Carol R. (1964). Languages with Expressions of Infinite Length. North-Holland Publishing Company. doi:10.1016/S0049-237X(08)70423-3. ISBN 978-0-444-53401-9.
- Barwise, Jon (1969). "Infinitary logic and admissible sets". The Journal of Symbolic Logic. 34 (2): 226–252. doi:10.2307/2271099. JSTOR 2271099.
