= List of set theory topics =

This page is a list of articles related to set theory.

== Articles on individual set theory topics ==
- Algebra of sets
- Axiom of choice
  - Axiom of countable choice
  - Axiom of dependent choice
  - Zorn's lemma
- Axiom of power set
- Boolean-valued model
- Burali-Forti paradox
- Cantor's back-and-forth method
- Cantor's diagonal argument
- Cantor's first uncountability proof
- Cantor's paradox
- Cantor's theorem
- Cantor–Bernstein–Schroeder theorem
- Cardinal number
  - Aleph number
  - Beth number
  - Hartogs number
- Cardinality
- Cartesian product
- Class (set theory)
- Complement (set theory)
- Complete Boolean algebra
- Continuum (set theory)
  - Suslin's problem
- Continuum hypothesis
- Countable set
- Descriptive set theory
  - Analytic set
  - Analytical hierarchy
  - Borel equivalence relation
  - Infinity-Borel set
  - Lightface analytic game
  - Perfect set property
  - Polish space
  - Prewellordering
  - Projective set
  - Property of Baire
  - Uniformization (set theory)
  - Universally measurable set
- Determinacy
  - AD+
  - Axiom of determinacy
  - Axiom of projective determinacy
  - Axiom of real determinacy
- Empty set
- Forcing (mathematics)
- Fuzzy set
- Hereditary set
- Internal set theory
- Intersection (set theory)
- Inner model theory
  - Core model
  - Covering lemma
  - Inner model
  - Mouse (set theory)
- L
- L(R)
- Large cardinal property
  - Inaccessible cardinal
  - Mahlo cardinal
  - Measurable cardinal
  - Supercompact cardinal
  - Weakly compact cardinal
- Linear partial information
- Multiset
- Musical set theory
- Ordinal number
  - Infinite descending chain
  - Limit ordinal
  - Successor ordinal
  - Transfinite induction
    - ∈-induction
  - Well-founded set
  - Well-order
- PCF theory
- Power set
- Projection
- Quasi-set theory
- Relation
- Rough set
- Russell's paradox
- Semiset
- Set theory
  - Alternative set theory
  - Axiomatic set theory
  - General set theory
  - Kripke–Platek set theory with urelements
  - Morse–Kelley set theory
  - Naive set theory
  - New Foundations
  - Pocket set theory
  - Positive set theory
  - S (Boolos 1989)
  - Scott–Potter set theory
  - Tarski–Grothendieck set theory
  - Von Neumann–Bernays–Gödel set theory
  - Zermelo–Fraenkel set theory
  - Zermelo set theory
- Set (mathematics)
- Set-builder notation
- Set-theoretic topology
- Simple theorems in the algebra of sets
- Subset
- Θ (set theory)
- Tree (descriptive set theory)
- Tree (set theory)
- Union (set theory)
- Von Neumann universe
- Zero sharp

== Lists related to set theory ==
- Glossary of set theory
- List of large cardinal properties
- List of properties of sets of reals
- List of set identities and relations

== Set theorists ==
- Wilhelm Ackermann
- James Earl Baumgartner
- Paul Bernays
- Andreas Blass
- George Boolos
- Bourbaki
- Georg Cantor
- Paul Cohen
- Richard Dedekind
- Paul Finsler
- Matthew Foreman
- Abraham Fraenkel
- Gottlob Frege
- Moti Gitik
- Kurt Gödel
- András Hajnal
- Felix Hausdorff
- Steve Jackson
- Thomas Jech
- Ronald Jensen
- Akihiro Kanamori
- Alexander S. Kechris
- Lyudmila Keldysh
- Kenneth Kunen
- Casimir Kuratowski
- Jean A. Larson
- Richard Laver
- Azriel Lévy
- Benedikt Löwe
- Nikolai Luzin
- Menachem Magidor
- Donald A. Martin
- Adrian Mathias
- Anthony Morse
- Yiannis N. Moschovakis
- Andrzej Mostowski
- John von Neumann
- Giuseppe Peano
- Willard Quine
- Bertrand Russell
- Dana Scott
- Saharon Shelah
- Wacław Sierpiński
- Jack Silver
- Thoralf Skolem
- Robert M. Solovay
- Mikhail Yakovlevich Suslin
- John R. Steel
- Gaisi Takeuti
- Alfred Tarski
- W. Hugh Woodin
- Ernst Zermelo

== Societies and organizations ==
- Association for Symbolic Logic
- The Cabal
