= Steve Jackson (mathematician) =

American mathematician

Stephen Craig Jackson is an American set theorist at the University of North Texas. Much of his most notable work has involved the descriptive set-theoretic consequences of the axiom of determinacy. In particular he is known for having calculated the values of all the projective ordinals (the suprema of the lengths of all prewellorderings of the real numbers at a particular level in the projective hierarchy) under the assumption that the axiom of determinacy holds.

In recent years he has also made contributions to the theory of Borel equivalence relations. With Dan Mauldin he solved the Steinhaus lattice problem.

Jackson earned his PhD in 1983 at UCLA under the direction of Donald A. Martin, with a dissertation on A Calculation of δ^{1}_{5}. In it, he proved that, under the axiom of determinacy,
$$\boldsymbol{\delta}^1_5=\aleph_{\omega^{\omega^{\omega}}+1}$$
thereby solving the first Victoria Delfino problem, one of the notorious problems of the combinatorics of the axiom of determinacy.
