= Homogeneously Suslin set =

In descriptive set theory, a set $S$ is said to be homogeneously Suslin if it is the projection of a homogeneous tree. $S$ is said to be $\kappa$-homogeneously Suslin if it is the projection of a $\kappa$-homogeneous tree.

If $A\subseteq{}^\omega\omega$ is a $\mathbf{\Pi}_1^1$ set and $\kappa$ is a measurable cardinal, then $A$ is $\kappa$-homogeneously Suslin. This result is important in the proof that the existence of a measurable cardinal implies that $\mathbf{\Pi}_1^1$ sets are determined.

== See also ==
- Projective determinacy
