= Homogeneous tree =

In descriptive set theory, a tree over a product set $Y\times Z$ is said to be homogeneous if there is a system of measures $\langle\mu_s\mid s\in{}^{<\omega}Y\rangle$ such that the following conditions hold:

- $\mu_s$ is a countably-additive measure on $\{t\mid\langle s,t\rangle\in T\}$ .
- The measures are in some sense compatible under restriction of sequences: if $s_1\subseteq s_2$, then $\mu_{s_1}(X)=1\iff\mu_{s_2}(\{t\mid t\upharpoonright lh(s_1)\in X\})=1$.
- If $x$ is in the projection of $T$, the ultrapower by $\langle\mu_{x\upharpoonright n}\mid n\in\omega\rangle$ is wellfounded.

An equivalent definition is produced when the final condition is replaced with the following:

- There are $\langle\mu_s\mid s\in{}^\omega Y\rangle$ such that if $x$ is in the projection of $[T]$ and $\forall n\in\omega\,\mu_{x\upharpoonright n}(X_n)=1$, then there is $f\in{}^\omega Z$ such that $\forall n\in\omega\,f\upharpoonright n\in X_n$. This condition can be thought of as a sort of countable completeness condition on the system of measures.

$T$ is said to be $\kappa$-homogeneous if each $\mu_s$ is $\kappa$-complete.

Homogeneous trees are involved in Martin and Steel's proof of projective determinacy.
