= Woodin cardinal =

Kind of large cardinal number

In set theory, a Woodin cardinal (named for W. Hugh Woodin) is a cardinal number $\lambda$ such that for all functions $f : \lambda \to \lambda$, there exists a cardinal $\kappa < \lambda$ with $\{f(\beta) \mid \beta < \kappa \} \subseteq \kappa$ and an elementary embedding $j : V \to M$ from the Von Neumann universe $V$ into a transitive inner model $M$ with critical point $\kappa$ and $V_{j(f)(\kappa)} \subseteq M$.

An equivalent definition is this: $\lambda$ is Woodin if and only if $\lambda$ is strongly inaccessible and for all $A \subseteq V_\lambda$ there exists a $\lambda_A < \lambda$ which is $<\lambda$-$A$-strong.

$\lambda _A$ being $<\lambda$-$A$-strong means that for all ordinals $\alpha < \lambda$, there exist a $j: V \to M$ which is an elementary embedding with critical point $\lambda _A$, $j(\lambda _A) > \alpha$, $V_\alpha \subseteq M$ and $j(A) \cap V_\alpha = A \cap V_\alpha$. (See also strong cardinal.)

A Woodin cardinal is preceded by a stationary set of measurable cardinals, and thus it is a Mahlo cardinal. However, the first Woodin cardinal is not even weakly compact.^{p. 364}

== Explanation ==
The hierarchy $V_\alpha$ (known as the von Neumann hierarchy) is defined by transfinite recursion on $\alpha$:

- $V_0 = \varnothing$,
- $V_{\alpha+1} = \mathcal P(V_\alpha)$,
- $V_\alpha = \bigcup_{\beta<\alpha}V_\beta$, when $\alpha$ is a limit ordinal.

For any ordinal $\alpha$, $V_\alpha$ is a set. The union of the sets $V_\alpha$ for all ordinals $\alpha$ is no longer a set, but a proper class. Some of the sets $V_\alpha$ have set-theoretic properties, for example when $\kappa$ is an inaccessible cardinal, $V_\kappa$ satisfies second-order ZFC ("satisfies" here means the notion of satisfaction from first-order logic).

For a transitive class $M$, a function $j:V\to M$ is said to be an elementary embedding if for any formula $\phi$ with free variables $x_1,\ldots,x_n$ in the language of set theory, it is the case that $V\vDash\phi(x_1,\ldots,x_n)$ iff $M\vDash\phi(j(x_1),\ldots,j(x_n))$, where $\vDash$ is first-order logic's notion of satisfaction as before. An elementary embedding $j$ is called nontrivial if it is not the identity. If $j:V\to M$ is a nontrivial elementary embedding, there exists an ordinal $\kappa$ such that $j(\kappa)\neq\kappa$, and the least such $\kappa$ is called the critical point of $j$.

Many large cardinal properties can be phrased in terms of elementary embeddings. For an ordinal $\beta$, a cardinal $\kappa$ is said to be $\beta$-strong if a transitive class $M$ can be found such that there is a nontrivial elementary embedding $j:V\to M$ whose critical point is $\kappa$, and in addition $V_\beta\subseteq M$.

A strengthening of the notion of $\beta$-strong cardinal is the notion of $A$-strongness of a cardinal $\kappa$ in a greater cardinal $\delta$: if $\kappa$ and $\delta$ are cardinals with $\kappa<\delta$, and $A$ is a subset of $V_\delta$, then $\kappa$ is said to be $A$-strong in $\delta$ if for all $\beta<\delta$, there is a nontrivial elementary embedding $j:V\to M$ witnessing that $\kappa$ is $\beta$-strong, and in addition $j(A)\cap V_\beta = A\cap V_\beta$. (This is a strengthening, as when letting $A = V_\delta$, $\kappa$ being $A$-strong in $\delta$ implies that $\kappa$ is $\beta$-strong for all $\beta<\delta$, as given any $\beta<\delta$, $V_\delta\cap V_\beta=V_\beta$ must be equal to $j(A)\cap V_\beta$, $V_\delta$ must be a subset of $j(A)$ and therefore a subset of the range of $j$.) Finally, a cardinal $\delta$ is Woodin if for any choice of $A\subseteq V_\delta$, there exists a $\kappa<\delta$ such that $\kappa$ is $A$-strong in $\delta$.

== Consequences ==
Woodin cardinals are important in descriptive set theory. By a result of Martin and Steel, existence of infinitely many Woodin cardinals implies projective determinacy, which in turn implies that every projective set is Lebesgue measurable, has the Baire property (differs from an open set by a meager set, that is, a set which is a countable union of nowhere dense sets), and the perfect set property (is either countable or contains a perfect subset).

The consistency of the existence of Woodin cardinals can be proved using determinacy hypotheses. Working in ZF+AD+DC one can prove that $\Theta _0$ is Woodin in the class of hereditarily ordinal-definable sets. $\Theta _0$ is the first ordinal onto which the continuum cannot be mapped by an ordinal-definable surjection (see Θ (set theory)).

Mitchell and Steel showed that assuming a Woodin cardinal exists, there is an inner model containing a Woodin cardinal in which there is a $\Delta_4^1$-well-ordering of the reals, ◊ holds, and the generalized continuum hypothesis holds.

Shelah proved that if the existence of a Woodin cardinal is consistent then it is consistent that the nonstationary ideal on $\omega_1$ is $\aleph_2$-saturated. Woodin also proved the equiconsistency of the existence of infinitely many Woodin cardinals and the existence of an $\aleph_1$-dense ideal over $\aleph_1$.

== Hyper-Woodin cardinals ==
A cardinal $\kappa$ is called hyper-Woodin if there exists a normal measure $U$ on $\kappa$ such that for every set $S$, the set

$\{\lambda < \kappa \mid \lambda$ is $< \kappa$-$S$-strong$\}$

is in $U$.

$\lambda$ is $<\kappa$-$S$-strong if and only if for each $\delta < \kappa$ there is a transitive class $N$ and an elementary embedding

$$j : V \to N$$

with

$$\lambda = \text{crit}(j),$$
$j(\lambda) \geq \delta$, and

$$j(S) \cap H_\delta = S \cap H_\delta$$.

The name alludes to the classical result that a cardinal is Woodin if and only if for every set $S$, the set

$\{\lambda < \kappa \mid \lambda$ is $< \kappa$-$S$-strong$\}$

is a stationary set.^{p. 363}

The measure $U$ will contain the set of all Shelah cardinals below $\kappa$.

== Weakly hyper-Woodin cardinals ==
A cardinal $\kappa$ is called weakly hyper-Woodin if for every set $S$ there exists a normal measure $U$ on $\kappa$ such that the set $\{\lambda < \kappa \mid \lambda$ is $< \kappa$-$S$-strong$\}$ is in $U$. $\lambda$ is $<\kappa$-$S$-strong if and only if for each $\delta < \kappa$ there is a transitive class $N$ and an elementary embedding $j : V \to N$ with $\lambda = \text{crit}(j)$, $j(\lambda) \geq \delta$, and $j(S) \cap H_\delta = S \cap H_\delta.$^{p. 3390}

The name alludes to the classic result that a cardinal is Woodin if for every set $S$, the set $\{\lambda < \kappa \mid \lambda$ is $< \kappa$-$S$-strong$\}$ is stationary.

The difference between hyper-Woodin cardinals and weakly hyper-Woodin cardinals is that the choice of $U$ does not depend on the choice of the set $S$ for hyper-Woodin cardinals.

== Woodin-in-the-next-admissible cardinals ==
Let $\delta$ be a cardinal and let $\alpha$ be the least admissible ordinal greater than $\delta$. The cardinal $\delta$ is said to be Woodin-in-the-next-admissible if for any function $f:\delta\to\delta$ such that $f\in L_\alpha(V_\delta)$, there exists $\kappa<\delta$ such that $f[\kappa]\subseteq\kappa$, and there is an extender $E\in V_\delta$ such that $\mathrm{crit}(E)=\kappa$ and $V_{i_E(f)(\kappa)}\subset\mathrm{Ult}(V,E)$. These cardinals appear when building models from iteration trees.^{p.4}
