= Cabal (set theory) =

Informal organization of set theorists

The Cabal was, or perhaps is, a set of set theorists in Southern California, particularly at UCLA and Caltech, but also at UC Irvine. Organization and procedures range from informal to nonexistent, so it is difficult to say whether it still exists or exactly who has been a member, but it has included such notable figures as Donald A. Martin, Yiannis N. Moschovakis, John R. Steel, and Alexander S. Kechris. Others who have published in the proceedings of the Cabal seminar include Robert M. Solovay, W. Hugh Woodin, Matthew Foreman, and Steve Jackson.

The work of the group is characterized by free use of large cardinal axioms, and research into the descriptive set theoretic behavior of sets of reals if such assumptions hold.

Some of the philosophical views of the Cabal seminar were described by Penelope Maddy.

== Publications ==
- Kechris, A. S.; Moschovakis, Y. N., eds. (1978). Cabal Seminar 76-77: Proceedings, Caltech-UCLA Logic Seminar 1976–77. Lecture Notes in Mathematics. Vol. 689. Berlin, Heidelberg: Springer. ISBN 978-3-540-09086-1.
- Kechris, A. S.; Martin, D. A.; Moschovakis, Y. N., eds. (1983). Cabal Seminar 79-81: Proceedings, Caltech-UCLA Logic Seminar 1979–81. Lecture Notes in Mathematics. Vol. 1019. Berlin, Heidelberg: Springer. ISBN 0-387-12688-0.
- Kechris, A. S.; Martin, D. A.; Steel, J. R., eds. (1988). Cabal Seminar 81-85: Proceedings, Caltech-UCLA Logic Seminar 1981–85. Lecture Notes in Mathematics. Vol. 1333. Berlin, Heidelberg: Springer. ISBN 3-540-50020-0.
- Kechris, Alexander S.; Löwe, Benedikt; Steel, John R., eds. (2008). Games, Scales, and Suslin Cardinals: The Cabal Seminar, Volume I. Lecture Notes in Logic. Cambridge University Press. ISBN 978-0-521-89951-2.
