= L(R) =

Smallest transitive inner model of ZF containing all the ordinals and all the reals

In set theory, L(R) (pronounced L of R) is the smallest transitive inner model of ZF containing all the ordinals and all the reals.

== Construction ==
L(R) can be constructed in a manner analogous to the construction of Gödel's constructible universe, L, by adding in all the reals at the start, and then iterating the definable powerset operation through all the ordinals.

== Assumptions ==
In general, the study of L(R) assumes a wide array of large cardinal axioms, since without these axioms one cannot show even that L(R) is distinct from L. But given that sufficient large cardinals exist, L(R) does not satisfy the axiom of choice, but rather the axiom of determinacy. However, L(R) will still satisfy the axiom of dependent choice, given only that the von Neumann universe, V, also satisfies that axiom.

== Results ==
Under the assumption of sufficiently strong large cardinal axioms, some additional results of the theory are:

- L(R) satisfies ZF + AD^{+}. (In particular, it satisfies the axiom of determinacy.)
- Every projective set of reals – and therefore every analytic set and every Borel set of reals – is an element of L(R).
- Every set of reals in L(R) is Lebesgue measurable (in fact, universally measurable) and has the property of Baire and the perfect set property.
- L(R) does not satisfy the axiom of uniformization or the axiom of real determinacy.
- R^{#}, the sharp of the set of all reals, has the smallest Wadge degree of any set of reals not contained in L(R).
- While not every relation on the reals in L(R) has a uniformization in L(R), every such relation does have a uniformization in L(R^{#}).
- Given any (set-size) generic extension V[G] of V, L(R) is an elementary submodel of L(R) as calculated in V[G]. Thus the theory of L(R) cannot be changed by forcing.
