= Partition cardinal =

In mathematics, a partition cardinal is either:

- An Erdős cardinal; or
- A Strong partition cardinal.
