= Core model =

In set theory, the core model is a definable inner model of the universe of all sets. Even though set theorists refer to "the core model", it is not a uniquely identified mathematical object. Rather, it is a class of inner models that under the right set-theoretic assumptions have very special properties, most notably covering properties. Intuitively, the core model is "the largest canonical inner model there is", (here "canonical" is an undefined term)^{p. 28} and is typically associated with a large cardinal notion. If Φ is a large cardinal notion, then the phrase "core model below Φ" refers to the definable inner model that exhibits the special properties under the assumption that there does not exist a cardinal satisfying Φ. The core model program seeks to analyze large cardinal axioms by determining the core models below them.

== History ==
The first core model was Kurt Gödel's constructible universe L. Ronald Jensen proved the covering lemma for L in the 1970s under the assumption of the non-existence of zero sharp, establishing that L is the "core model below zero sharp". The work of Solovay isolated another core model L[U], for U an ultrafilter on a measurable cardinal (and its associated "sharp", zero dagger). Together with Tony Dodd, Jensen constructed the Dodd–Jensen core model ("the core model below a measurable cardinal") and proved the covering lemma for it and a generalized covering lemma for L[U].

Mitchell used coherent sequences of measures to develop core models containing multiple or higher-order measurables. Still later, the Steel core model used extenders and iteration trees to construct a core model below a Woodin cardinal.

== Construction of core models ==
Core models are constructed by transfinite recursion from small fragments of the core model called mice. An important ingredient of the construction is the comparison lemma that allows giving a wellordering of the relevant mice.

At the level of strong cardinals and above, one constructs an intermediate countably certified core model K^{c}, and then, if possible, extracts K from K^{c}.

== Properties of core models ==
K_{c} (and hence K) is a fine-structural countably iterable extender model below long extenders. (It is not currently known how to deal with long extenders, which establish that a cardinal is superstrong.) Here countable iterability means ω_{1}+1 iterability for all countable elementary substructures of initial segments, and it suffices to develop basic theory, including certain condensation properties. The theory of such models is canonical and well understood. They satisfy GCH, the diamond principle for all stationary subsets of regular cardinals, the square principle (except at subcompact cardinals), and other principles holding in L.

K^{c} is maximal in several senses. K^{c} computes the successors of measurable and many singular cardinals correctly. Also, it is expected that under an appropriate weakening of countable certifiability, K^{c} would correctly compute the successors of all weakly compact and singular strong limit cardinals correctly. If V is closed under a mouse operator (an inner model operator), then so is K^{c}. K^{c} has no sharp: There is no natural non-trivial elementary embedding of K^{c} into itself. (However, unlike K, K^{c} may be elementarily self-embeddable.)

If in addition there are also no Woodin cardinals in this model (except in certain specific cases, it is not known how the core model should be defined if K_{c} has Woodin cardinals), we can extract the actual core model K. K is also its own core model. K is locally definable and generically absolute: For every generic extension of V, for every cardinal κ>ω_{1} in V[G], K as constructed in H(κ) of V[G] equals K∩H(κ). (This would not be possible had K contained Woodin cardinals). K is maximal, universal, and fully iterable. This implies that for every iterable extender model M (called a mouse), there is an elementary embedding M→N and of an initial segment of K into N, and if M is universal, the embedding is of K into M.

It is conjectured that if K exists and V is closed under a sharp operator M, then K is Σ^{1}_{1} correct allowing real numbers in K as parameters and M as a predicate. That amounts to Σ^{1}_{3} correctness (in the usual sense) if M is x→x^{#}.

The core model can also be defined above a particular set of ordinals X: X belongs to K(X), but K(X) satisfies the usual properties of K above X. If there is no iterable inner model with ω Woodin cardinals, then for some X, K(X) exists. The above discussion of K and K^{c} generalizes to K(X) and K^{c}(X).

== Construction of core models ==
Conjecture:

- If there is no ω_{1}+1 iterable model with long extenders (and hence models with superstrong cardinals), then K^{c} exists.
- If K^{c} exists and as constructed in every generic extension of V (equivalently, under some generic collapse Coll(ω, <κ) for a sufficiently large ordinal κ) satisfies "there are no Woodin cardinals", then the Core Model K exists.

Partial results for the conjecture are that:

1. If there is no inner model with a Woodin cardinal, then K exists.
2. If (boldface) Σ^{1}_{n} determinacy (n is finite) holds in every generic extension of V, but there is no iterable inner model with n Woodin cardinals, then K exists.
3. If there is a measurable cardinal κ, then either K^{c} below κ exists, or there is an ω_{1}+1 iterable model with measurable limit λ of both Woodin cardinals and cardinals strong up to λ.

If V has Woodin cardinals but not cardinals strong past a Woodin one, then under appropriate circumstances (a candidate for) K can be constructed by constructing K below each Woodin cardinal (and below the class of all ordinals) κ but above that K as constructed below the supremum of Woodin cardinals below κ. The candidate core model is not fully iterable (iterability fails at Woodin cardinals) or generically absolute, but otherwise behaves like K.
