= List of properties of sets of reals =

This article lists some properties of sets of real numbers. The general study of these concepts forms descriptive set theory, which has a rather different emphasis from general topology.

== Definability properties ==
- Borel set
- Analytic set
- C-measurable set
- Projective set
- Inductive set
- Infinity-Borel set
- Suslin set
- Homogeneously Suslin set
- Weakly homogeneously Suslin set
- Set of uniqueness

== Regularity properties ==
- Property of Baire
- Lebesgue measurable
- Universally measurable set
- Perfect set property
- Universally Baire set

== Largeness and smallness properties ==
- Meager set
- Comeager set - A comeager set is one whose complement is meager.
- Null set
- Conull set
- Dense set
- Nowhere dense set
