= Axiom of real determinacy =

Axiom of set theory

In mathematics, the axiom of real determinacy (abbreviated as AD_{R}) is an axiom in set theory. It states the following:

Axiom—Consider infinite two-person games with perfect information. Then, every game of length ω where both players choose real numbers is determined, i.e., one of the two players has a winning strategy.

The axiom of real determinacy is a stronger version of the axiom of determinacy (AD), which makes the same statement about games where both players choose integers; AD_{R} is inconsistent with the axiom of choice. It also implies the existence of inner models with certain large cardinals.

AD_{R} is equivalent to AD plus the axiom of uniformization.

== See also ==
- AD^{+}
- Axiom of projective determinacy
- Topological game
