= Edward Kofler =

Swiss mathematician

- Edward Kofler in 1940
- Born: 16 November 1911; Brzeżany, Austria-Hungary
- Died: 22 April 2007 (aged 95); Zurich, Switzerland
- Education: University of Lwów; Jagiellonian University
- Known for: Developing the linear partial information theory (LPI)
- Scientific career
- Fields: Mathematics
- Workplaces: University of Warsaw; University of Zurich; Swiss National Science Foundation

Edward Kofler (16 November 1911 – 22 April 2007) was a Polish-born Swiss mathematician who made important contributions to game theory and fuzzy logic by working out the theory of linear partial information.

== Biography ==
Kofler was born in Brzeżany, Austria-Hungary (now Berezhany, western Ukraine) and graduated as a disciple of among others Hugo Steinhaus and Stefan Banach from the University of Lwów Poland (now Ukraine) and the Jagiellonian University, having studied game theory. After graduation in 1939 Kofler returned to his family in Kolomyia (today Kolomea in Ukraine), where he taught mathematics in a Polish high school. After German attack on the town 1 July 1941 he succeeded to escape to Kazakhstan together with his wife. At Alma-Ata he managed a Polish school with orphanage in exile and worked there as mathematics teacher. After World War II ended he returned home with the orphanage. He was accompanied by his wife and their baby son. The family settled in Poland. From 1959 he accepted the position of lecturer at the University of Warsaw in the faculty of economics. In 1962 he gained a Ph.D. with his thesis Economic Decisions, Applying Game Theory. Then in 1962 he became assistant professor at the faculty of social science in the same university, specializing in econometrics.

In 1969 he migrated to Zurich, Switzerland, where he was employed at the Institute for Empirical Research in Economics at the University of Zurich and scientific advisor at the Swiss National Science Foundation (Schweizerische Nationalfonds zur Förderung der wissenschaftlichen Forschung). In Zurich in 1970 Kofler developed his linear partial information (LPI) theory allowing qualified decisions to be made on the basis of fuzzy logic: incomplete or fuzzy a priori information.

Kofler was visiting professor at the University of Saint Petersburg (former Leningrad, Russia), University of Heidelberg (Germany), McMaster University (Hamilton, Ontario, Canada) and University of Leeds (England). He collaborated with many well known specialists in information theory, such as Oskar R. Lange in Poland, Nicolai Vorobiev in the Soviet Union, Günter Menges in Germany, and Heidi Schelbert and Peter Zweifel in Zurich. He was the author of many books and articles. He died in Zurich.

== See also ==
- Decision making
- Stochastics
- Probability
- Lwów School of Mathematics

== Bibliography ==
- "Set theory Considerations on the Chess Game and the Theory of Corresponding Elements"- Mathematics Seminar at the University of Lviv, 1936
- On the history of mathematics (Fejezetek a matematika történetéből), Warsaw 1962 and Budapest 1965
- From the digit to infinity – book, 312 pages, Warsaw 1960
- Economic decisions and the theory of games – Dissertation, University of Warsaw 1961
- Introduction to game theory – book, 230 pages, Warsaw 1962
- Optimization of multiple goals, Przeglad Statystyczny, Warsaw 1965
- The value of information – book, 104 pages, Warsaw 1967
- (With H. Greniewski and N. Vorobiev) Strategy of games, book, 80 pages, Warsaw 1968
- "Das Modell des Spiels in der wissenschaftlichen Planung" Mathematik und Wirtschaft No.7, East Berlin 1969
- Konfidenzintervalle in Entscheidungen bei Ungewissheit, Stattliche Hefte, 1976/1
- "Entscheidungen bei teilweise bekannter Verteilung der Zustande", Zeitschrift für OR, Bd. 18/3, 1974, S 141-157
- "Konfidenzintervalle in Entscheidungen bei Ungewissheit", Statistische Hefte, 1976/1, S. 1-21
- (With G. Menges) Entscheidungen bei unvollständiger Information, Springer Verlag, 1976
- (With G. Menges) "Cognitive Decisions under Partial Information", in R.J. Bogdan (ed.), Local Induction, Reidel, Dordrecht-Holland, 1976
- (With G. Menges) "Entscheidungen bei unvollständiger Information", volume 136 of Lecture Notes in Economics and Mathematical Systems. Springer, Berlin, 1976.
- (With G. Menges) "Stochastic Linearisation of Indeterminateness" in Mathematical Economics and Game Theory, (Springer) Berlin–Heidelberg–New York City 1977, pp. 20–63
- (With G. Menges) "Die Strukturierung von Unbestimmtheiten und eine Verallgemeinerung des Axiomensystems von Kolmogoroff", Statistische Hefte 1977/4, pp. 297–302
- (With G. Menges) "Lineare partielle Information, fuzziness und Vielziele-Optimierung", Proceedings in Operations Research 8, Physica-Verlag 1979
- (With Fahrion, R., Huschens, S., Kuß, U., and Menges, G.) "Stochastische partielle Information (SPI)", Statistische Hefte, Bd. 21, Jg. 1980, S. 160-167
- "Fuzzy sets- oder LPI-Theorie?" in G. Menges, H. Schelbert, P. Zweifel (eds.), Stochastische Unschärfe in Wirtschaftswissenschaften, Haag & Herchen, Frankfurt, 1981
- (With P. Zweifel)"Decisions under Fuzzy State Distribution with Application to the dealt Risks of Nuclear Power", in Haag, W. (ed.), Large Scale Energy Systems, (Pergamon), Oxford 1981, pp. 437-444
- "Extensive Spiele bei unvollständiger Information", in Information in der Wirtschaft, Gesellschaft für Wirtschafts- und Sozialwissenschaften, Band 126, Berlin 1982
- "Equilibrium Points, Stability and Regulation in Fuzzy Optimisation Systems under Linear Partial Stochastic Information (LPI)", Proceedings of the International Congress of Cybernetics and Systems, AFCET, Paris 1984, pp. 233–240
- "Fuzzy Weighing in Multiple Objective Decision Making, G. Menges Contribution and Some New Developments", Beitrag zum Gedenkband G. Menges, Hrgb. Schneeweiss, H., Strecker H., Springer Verlag 1984
- (With Z. W. Kmietowicz, and A. D. Pearman) "Decision making with Linear Partial Information (L.P.I.)". The Journal of the Operational Research Society, 35(12):1079-1090, 1984
- (With P. Zweifel, A. Zimmermann) "Application of the Linear Partial Information (LPI) to forecasting the Swiss timber market" Journal of Forecasting 1985, v4(4),387-398
- (With Peter Zweifel) "Exploiting linear partial information for optimal use of forecasts with an application to U.S. economic policy, International Journal of Forecasting, 1988

E. Kofler's work from 1989 "Forecasting and Stability under Fuzzy Information"

- "Prognosen und Stabilität bei unvollständiger Information", Campus 1989
- (With P. Zweifel) "Convolution of Fuzzy Distributions in Decision Making", Statistical Papers 32, Springer 1991, p. 123-136
- (With P. Zweifel) "One-Shot Decisions under Linear Partial Information" Theory and Decision 34, 1993, p. 1-20
- "Decision Making under Linear Partial Information". Proceedings of the European Congress EUFIT, Aachen, 1994, p. 891-896
- (With P. Zweifel) "Linear Partial Information in One-Shot Decisions", Selecta Statistica Vol. IX, 1996
- Mehrfache Zielsetzung in wirtschaftlichen Entscheidungen bei unscharfen Daten, Institut für Empirische Wirtschaftsforschung, 9602, 1996
- "Linear Partial Information with Applications". Proceedings of ISFL 1997 (International Symposium on Fuzzy Logic), Zurich, 1997, p. 235-239
- (With Thomas Kofler) "Forecasting Analysis of the Economic Growth", Selecta Statistica Canadiana, 1998
- "Linear Partial Information with Applications in Fuzzy Sets and Systems", 1998. North-Holland
- (With Thomas Kofler) Fuzzy Logic and Economic Decisions, 1998
- (With L. Götte) "Fuzzy Systems and their Game Theoretical Solution", International Conference on Operations Research, ETH, Zurich, August 1998
- "Forecasting and Optimal Strategies in Fuzzy Chess Situations ("Prognosen und Optimale Strategien in unscharfen Schachsituationen"), Idee & Form No. 70, 2001 Zurich, pp. 2065 & 2067
- (With P. Zweifel) "One-shot decisions under Linear Partial Information" - Springer Netherlands, 2005
