= Linear partial information =

Linear partial information (LPI) is a method of making decisions based on insufficient or fuzzy information. LPI was introduced in 1970 by Polish–Swiss mathematician Edward Kofler (1911–2007) to simplify decision processes. Compared to other methods the LPI-fuzziness is algorithmically simple and particularly in decision making, more practically oriented. Instead of an indicator function the decision maker linearizes any fuzziness by establishing of linear restrictions for fuzzy probability distributions or normalized weights. In the LPI-procedure the decision maker linearizes any fuzziness instead of applying a membership function. This can be done by establishing stochastic and non-stochastic LPI-relations. A mixed stochastic and non-stochastic fuzzification is often a basis for the LPI-procedure. By using the LPI-methods any fuzziness in any decision situation can be considered on the base of the linear fuzzy logic.

== Definition ==
Any Stochastic Partial Information SPI(p), which can be considered as a solution of a linear inequality system, is called Linear Partial Information LPI(p) about probability p. It can be considered as an LPI-fuzzification of the probability p corresponding to the concepts of linear fuzzy logic.

== Applications ==
The MaxEmin Principle
To obtain the maximally warranted expected value, the decision maker has to choose the strategy which maximizes the minimal expected value. This procedure leads to the MaxEmin – Principle and is an extension of the Bernoulli's principle.
The MaxWmin Principle
This principle leads to the maximal guaranteed weight function, regarding the extreme weights.
The Prognostic Decision Principle (PDP)
This principle is based on the prognosis interpretation of strategies under fuzziness.

== Fuzzy equilibrium and stability ==
Despite the fuzziness of information, it is often necessary to choose the optimal, most cautious strategy, for example in economic planning, in conflict situations or in daily decisions. This is impossible without the concept of fuzzy equilibrium. The concept of fuzzy stability is considered as an extension into a time interval, taking into account the corresponding stability area of the decision maker. The more complex is the model, the softer a choice has to be considered. The idea of fuzzy equilibrium is based on the optimization principles. Therefore, the MaxEmin-, MaxGmin- and PDP-stability have to be analyzed. The violation of these principles leads often to wrong predictions and decisions.

== LPI equilibrium point ==
Considering a given LPI-decision model, as a convolution of the corresponding fuzzy states or a disturbance set, the fuzzy equilibrium strategy remains the most cautious one, despite the presence of the fuzziness. Any deviation from this strategy can cause a loss for the decision maker.

== See also ==
- Edward Kofler
- Fuzzy set
- Fuzzy logic
- Game theory
- Defuzzification
- Stochastic process
- Deterministic
- Probability distribution
- Uncertainty
- Vagueness
- Optimization (mathematics)
- Logic
- List of set theory topics

== Selected references ==
- Edward Kofler – Equilibrium Points, Stability and Regulation in Fuzzy Optimisation Systems under Linear Partial Stochastic Information (LPI), Proceedings of the International Congress of Cybernetics and Systems, AFCET, Paris 1984, pp. 233–240
- Edward Kofler – Decision Making under Linear Partial Information. Proceedings of the European Congress EUFIT, Aachen, 1994, pp. 891–896.
- Edward Kofler – Linear Partial Information with Applications. Proceedings of ISFL 1997 (International Symposium on Fuzzy Logic), Zurich, 1997, p. 235–239.
- Edward Kofler – Entscheidungen bei teilweise bekannter Verteilung der Zustände, Zeitschrift für OR, Vol. 18/3, 1974
- Edward Kofler – Extensive Spiele bei unvollständiger Information, in Information in der Wirtschaft, Gesellschaft für Wirtschafts- und Sozialwissenschaften, Band 126, Berlin 1982
