= Strong partition cardinal =

In Zermelo–Fraenkel set theory without the axiom of choice, a strong partition cardinal is an uncountable well-ordered cardinal $k$ such that every partition of the set $[k]^k$of size $k$ subsets of $k$ into less than $k$ pieces has a homogeneous set of size $k$.

The existence of strong partition cardinals contradicts the axiom of choice. The axiom of determinacy implies that ℵ_{1} is a strong partition cardinal.
