= Scale (descriptive set theory) =

In the mathematical discipline of descriptive set theory, a scale is a certain kind of object defined on a set of points in some Polish space (for example, a scale might be defined on a set of real numbers). Scales were originally isolated as a concept in the theory of uniformization, but have found wide applicability in descriptive set theory, with applications such as establishing bounds on the possible lengths of wellorderings of a given complexity, and showing (under certain assumptions) that there are largest countable sets of certain complexities.

== Formal definition ==
Given a pointset A contained in some product space

$$A\subseteq X=X_0\times X_1\times\ldots X_{m-1}$$

where each X_{k} is either the Baire space or a countably infinite discrete set, we say that a norm on A is a map from A into the ordinal numbers. Each norm has an associated prewellordering, where one element of A precedes another element if the norm of the first is less than the norm of the second.

A scale on A is a countably infinite collection of norms

$$(\phi_n)_{n<\omega}$$

with the following properties:

If the sequence x_{i} is such that

x_{i} is an element of A for each natural number i, and
x_{i} converges to an element x in the product space X, and
for each natural number n there is an ordinal λ_{n} such that φ_{n}(x_{i})=λ_{n} for all sufficiently large i, then

x is an element of A, and
for each n, φ_{n}(x)≤λ_{n}.

By itself, at least granted the axiom of choice, the existence of a scale on a pointset is trivial, as A can be wellordered and each φ_{n} can simply enumerate A. To make the concept useful, a definability criterion must be imposed on the norms (individually and together). Here "definability" is understood in the usual sense of descriptive set theory; it need not be definability in an absolute sense, but rather indicates membership in some pointclass of sets of reals. The norms φ_{n} themselves are not sets of reals, but the corresponding prewellorderings are (at least in essence).

The idea is that, for a given pointclass Γ, we want the prewellorderings below a given point in A to be uniformly represented both as a set in Γ and as one in the dual pointclass of Γ, relative to the "larger" point being an element of A. Formally, we say that the φ_{n} form a Γ-scale on A if they form a scale on A and there are ternary relations S and T such that, if y is an element of A, then

$$\forall n\forall x(\varphi_n(x)\leq\varphi_n(y) \iff S(n,x,y) \iff T(n,x,y))$$

where S is in Γ and T is in the dual pointclass of Γ (that is, the complement of T is in Γ). Note here that we think of φ_{n}(x) as being ∞ whenever x∉A; thus the condition φ_{n}(x)≤φ_{n}(y), for y∈A, also implies x∈A.

The definition does not imply that the collection of norms is in the intersection of Γ with the dual pointclass of Γ. This is because the three-way equivalence is conditional on y being an element of A. For y not in A, it might be the case that one or both of S(n,x,y) or T(n,x,y) fail to hold, even if x is in A (and therefore automatically φ_{n}(x)≤φ_{n}(y)=∞).

== Scale property ==
The scale property is a strengthening of the prewellordering property. For pointclasses of a certain form, it implies that relations in the given pointclass have a uniformization that is also in the pointclass.
