= Covering lemma =

In the foundations of mathematics, a covering lemma is used to prove that the non-existence of certain large cardinals leads to the existence of a canonical inner model, called the core model, that is, in a sense, maximal and approximates the structure of the von Neumann universe V. A covering lemma asserts that under some particular anti-large cardinal assumption, the core model exists and is maximal in a sense that depends on the chosen large cardinal. The first such result was proved by Ronald Jensen for the constructible universe assuming 0^{#} does not exist, which is now known as Jensen's covering theorem.

== Example ==
For example, if there is no inner model for a measurable cardinal, then the Dodd–Jensen core model, K^{DJ} is the core model and satisfies the covering property, that is for every uncountable set x of ordinals, there is y such that y ⊃ x, y has the same cardinality as x, and y ∈ K^{DJ}. (If 0^{#} does not exist, then K^{DJ} = L.)

== Versions ==
If the core model K exists (and has no Woodin cardinals), then

1. If K has no ω_{1}-Erdős cardinals, then for a particular countable (in K) and definable in K sequence of functions from ordinals to ordinals, every set of ordinals closed under these functions is a union of a countable number of sets in K. If L=K, these are simply the primitive recursive functions.
2. If K has no measurable cardinals, then for every uncountable set x of ordinals, there is y ∈ K such that x ⊂ y and |x| = |y|.
3. If K has only one measurable cardinal κ, then for every uncountable set x of ordinals, there is y ∈ K[C] such that x ⊂ y and |x| = |y|. Here C is either empty or Prikry generic over K (so it has order type ω and is cofinal in κ) and unique except up to a finite initial segment.
4. If K has no inaccessible limit of measurable cardinals and no proper class of measurable cardinals, then there is a maximal and unique (except for a finite set of ordinals) set C (called a system of indiscernibles) for K such that for every sequence S in K of measure one sets consisting of one set for each measurable cardinal, C minus ∪S is finite. Note that every κ \ C is either finite or Prikry generic for K at κ except for members of C below a measurable cardinal below κ. For every uncountable set x of ordinals, there is y ∈ K[C] such that x ⊂ y and |x| = |y|.
5. For every uncountable set x of ordinals, there is a set C of indiscernibles for total extenders on K such that there is y ∈ K[C] and x ⊂ y and |x| = |y|.
6. K computes the successors of singular and weakly compact cardinals correctly (Weak Covering Property). Moreover, if |κ| > ω_{1}, then cofinality((κ^{+})^{K}) ≥ |κ|.

== Extenders and indiscernibles ==
For core models without overlapping total extenders, the systems of indiscernibles are well understood. Although (if K has an inaccessible limit of measurable cardinals), the system may depend on the set to be covered, it is well-determined and unique in a weaker sense. One application of the covering is counting the number of (sequences of) indiscernibles, which gives optimal lower bounds for various failures of the singular cardinals hypothesis. For example, if K does not have overlapping total extenders, and κ is singular strong limit, and 2^{κ} = κ^{++}, then κ has Mitchell order at least κ^{++} in K. Conversely, a failure of the singular cardinal hypothesis can be obtained (in a generic extension) from κ with o(κ) = κ^{++}.

For core models with overlapping total extenders (that is with a cardinal strong up to a measurable one), the systems of indiscernibles are poorly understood, and applications (such as the weak covering) tend to avoid rather than analyze the indiscernibles.

== Additional properties ==
If K exists, then every regular Jónsson cardinal is Ramsey in K. Every singular cardinal that is regular in K is measurable in K.

Also, if the core model K(X) exists above a set X of ordinals, then it has the above discussed covering properties above X.
