= Determinacy =

Subfield of set theory

Determinacy is a subfield of game theory and set theory that examines the conditions under which one or the other player of a game has a winning strategy, and the consequences of the existence of such strategies. Alternatively and similarly, "determinacy" is the property of a game whereby such a strategy exists. Determinacy was introduced by Gale and Stewart in 1950, under the name determinateness.

The games studied in set theory are usually Gale–Stewart games—two-player games of perfect information in which the players make an infinite sequence of moves and there are no draws. The field of game theory studies more general kinds of games, including games with draws such as tic-tac-toe, chess, or infinite chess, or games with imperfect information such as poker.

== Basic notions ==
=== Games ===
The first sort of game we shall consider is the two-player game of perfect information of length ω, in which the players play natural numbers. These games are often called Gale–Stewart games.

In this sort of game there are two players, often named I and II, who take turns playing natural numbers, with I going first. They play "forever"; that is, their plays are indexed by the natural numbers. When they're finished, a predetermined condition decides which player won. This condition need not be specified by any definable rule; it may simply be an arbitrary (infinitely long) lookup table saying who has won given a particular sequence of plays.

More formally, consider a subset A of Baire space; recall that the latter consists of all ω-sequences of natural numbers. Then in the game G_{A}, I plays a natural number a_{0}, then II plays a_{1}, then I plays a_{2}, and so on. Then I wins the game if and only if

$$\langle a_0,a_1,a_2,\ldots\rangle\in A$$

and otherwise II wins. A is then called the payoff set of G_{A}.

It is assumed that each player can see all moves preceding each of his moves, and also knows the winning condition.

=== Strategies ===
Informally, a strategy for a player is a way of playing in which his plays are entirely determined by the foregoing plays. Again, such a "way" does not have to be capable of being captured by any explicable "rule", but may simply be a lookup table.

More formally, a strategy for player I (for a game in the sense of the preceding subsection) is a function that accepts as an argument any finite sequence of natural numbers, of even length, and returns a natural number. If σ is such a strategy and <a_{0},...,a_{2n-1}> is a sequence of plays, then σ(<a_{0},...,a_{2n-1}>) is the next play I will make, if I is following the strategy σ. Strategies for II are just the same, substituting "odd" for "even".

Note that we have said nothing, as yet, about whether a strategy is in any way good. A strategy might direct a player to make aggressively bad moves, and it would still be a strategy. In fact it is not necessary even to know the winning condition for a game, to know what strategies exist for the game.

=== Winning strategies ===
A strategy is winning if the player following it must necessarily win, no matter what his opponent plays. For example, if σ is a strategy for I, then σ is a winning strategy for I in the game G_{A} if, for any sequence of natural numbers to be played by II, say <a_{1},a_{3},a_{5},...>, the sequence of plays produced by σ when II plays thus, namely

$$\langle\sigma(\langle\rangle),a_1,\sigma(\langle\sigma(\langle\rangle),a_1\rangle),a_3,\ldots\rangle$$

is an element of A.

=== Determined games ===
A (class of) game(s) is determined if for all instances of the game there is a winning strategy for one of the players (not necessarily the same player for each instance). There cannot be a winning strategy for both players for the same game, for if there were, the two strategies could be played against each other. The resulting outcome would then, by hypothesis, be a win for both players, which is impossible.

== Determinacy from elementary considerations ==
All finite games of perfect information in which draws do not occur are determined.

Real-world games of perfect information, such as tic-tac-toe, chess, or infinite chess, are always finished in a finite number of moves (in infinite chess-games this assumes the 50-move rule is applied). If such a game is modified so that a particular player wins under any condition where the game would have been called a draw, then it is always determined. The condition that the game is always over (i.e. all possible extensions of the finite position result in a win for the same player) in a finite number of moves corresponds to the topological condition that the set A giving the winning condition for G_{A} is clopen in the topology of Baire space.

For example, modifying the rules of chess to make drawn games a win for Black makes chess a determined game. As it happens, chess has a finite number of positions and a draw-by-repetition rules, so with these modified rules, if play continues long enough without White having won, then Black can eventually force a win (due to the modification of draw = win for black).

The proof that such games are determined is rather simple: Player I simply plays not to lose; that is, player I plays to make sure that player II does not have a winning strategy after I's move. If player I cannot do this, then it means player II had a winning strategy from the beginning. On the other hand, if player I can play in this way, then I must win, because the game will be over after some finite number of moves, and player I can't have lost at that point.

This proof does not actually require that the game always be over in a finite number of moves, only that it be over in a finite number of moves whenever II wins. That condition, topologically, is that the set A is closed. This fact—that all closed games are determined—is called the Gale–Stewart theorem. Note that by symmetry, all open games are determined as well. (A game is open if I can win only by winning in a finite number of moves.)

== Determinacy from ZFC ==
David Gale and F. M. Stewart proved the open and closed games are determined. Determinacy for second level of the Borel hierarchy games was shown by Wolfe in 1955. Over the following 20 years, additional research using ever-more-complicated arguments established that third and fourth levels of the Borel hierarchy are determined.

In 1975, Donald A. Martin proved that all Borel games are determined; that is, if A is a Borel subset of Baire space, then G_{A} is determined. This result, known as Borel determinacy, is the best possible determinacy result provable in ZFC, in the sense that the determinacy of the next higher Wadge class is not provable in ZFC.

In 1971, before Martin obtained his proof, Harvey Friedman showed that any proof of Borel determinacy must use the axiom of replacement in an essential way, in order to iterate the powerset axiom transfinitely often. Friedman's work gives a level-by-level result detailing how many iterations of the powerset axiom are necessary to guarantee determinacy at each level of the Borel hierarchy.

For every integer n, ZFC\P proves determinacy in the nth level of the difference hierarchy of $\mathbf{\Pi}^0_3$ sets, but ZFC\P does not prove that for every integer n nth level of the difference hierarchy of $\Pi^0_3$ sets is determined. See reverse mathematics for other relations between determinacy and subsystems of second-order arithmetic.

== Determinacy and large cardinals ==
There is an intimate relationship between determinacy and large cardinals. In general, stronger large cardinal axioms prove the determinacy of larger pointclasses, higher in the Wadge hierarchy, and the determinacy of such pointclasses, in turn, proves the existence of inner models of slightly weaker large cardinal axioms than those used to prove the determinacy of the pointclass in the first place.

=== Measurable cardinals ===
It follows from the existence of a measurable cardinal that every analytic game (also called a Σ^{1}_{1} game) is determined, or equivalently that every coanalytic (or Π^{1}_{1} ) game is determined. (See Projective hierarchy for definitions.)

Actually a measurable cardinal is more than enough. A weaker principle — the existence of 0^{#} is sufficient to prove coanalytic determinacy, and a little bit more: The precise result is that the existence of 0^{#} is equivalent to the determinacy of all levels of the difference hierarchy below the ω^{2} level, i.e. ω·n-Π^{1}_{1} determinacy for every $n$.

From a measurable cardinal we can improve this very slightly to ω^{2}-Π^{1}_{1} determinacy. From the existence of more measurable cardinals, one can prove the determinacy of more levels of the difference hierarchy over Π^{1}_{1}.

==== Proof of determinacy from sharps ====
For every real number r, $\Sigma^1_1(r)$ determinacy is equivalent to existence of r^{#}. To illustrate how large cardinals lead to determinacy, here is a proof of $\Sigma^1_1(r)$ determinacy given existence of r^{#}.

Let A be a $\Sigma^1_1(r)$ subset of the Baire space. A = p[T] for some tree T (constructible from r) on (ω, ω). (That is x∈A iff from some y, $((x_0,y_0),(x_1,y_1),...)$ is a path through T.)

Given a partial play s, let $T_s$ be the subtree of T consistent with s subject to max(y_{0},y_{1},...,y_{len(s)-1})<len(s). The additional condition ensures that $T_s$ is finite. Consistency means that every path through $T_s$ is of the form $((x_0,y_0),(x_1,y_1),...,(x_i,y_i))$ where $(x_0,x_1,...,x_i)$ is an initial segment of s.

To prove that A is determined, define auxiliary game as follows:
In addition to ordinary moves, player 2 must play a mapping of $T_s$ into ordinals (below a sufficiently large ordinal κ) such that

- each new move extends the previous mapping and
- the ordering of the ordinals agrees with the Kleene–Brouwer order on $T_s$.

Recall that Kleene–Brouwer order is like lexicographical order except that if s properly extends t then s<t. It is a well-ordering iff the tree is well-founded.

The auxiliary game is open. Proof: If player 2 does not lose at a finite stage, then the union of all $T_s$ (which is the tree that corresponds to the play) is well-founded, and so the result of the non-auxiliary play is not in A.

Thus, the auxiliary game is determined. Proof: By transfinite induction, for each ordinal α compute the set of positions where player 1 can force a win in α steps, where a position with player 2 to move is losing (for player 2) in α steps iff for every move the resulting position is losing in less than α steps. One strategy for player 1 is to reduce α with each position (say picking the least α and breaking ties by picking the least move), and one strategy for player 2 is to pick the least (actually any would work) move that does not lead to a position with an α assigned. Note that L(r) contains the set of winning positions as well as the winning strategies given above.

A winning strategy for player 2 in the original game leads to winning strategy in the auxiliary game: The subtree of T corresponding to the winning strategy is well-founded, so player 2 can pick ordinals based on the Kleene–Brouwer order of the tree. Also, trivially, a winning strategy for player 2 in the auxiliary game gives a winning strategy for player 2 in original game.

It remains to show that using r^{#}, the above-mentioned winning strategy for player 1 in the auxiliary game can be converted into a winning strategy in the original game. r^{#} gives a proper class I of (L(r),∈,r) indiscernible ordinals. By indiscernibility, if κ and the ordinals in the auxiliary response are in I, then the moves by player 1 do not depend on the auxiliary moves (or on κ), and so the strategy can be converted into a strategy for the original game (since player 2 can hold out with indiscernibles for any finite number of steps). Suppose that player 1 loses in the original game. Then, the tree corresponding to a play is well-founded. Therefore, player 2 can win the auxiliary game by using auxiliary moves based on the indiscernibles (since the order type of indiscernibles exceeds the Kleene–Brouwer order of the tree), which contradicts player 1 winning the auxiliary game.

=== Woodin cardinals ===
If there is a Woodin cardinal with a measurable cardinal above it, then Π^{1}_{2} determinacy holds. More generally, if there are n Woodin cardinals with a measurable cardinal above them all, then Π^{1}_{n+1} determinacy holds. From Π^{1}_{n+1} determinacy, it follows that there is a transitive inner model containing n Woodin cardinals.

$\Delta^1_2$ (lightface) determinacy is equiconsistent with a Woodin cardinal. If $\Delta^1_2$ determinacy holds, then for a Turing cone of x (that is for every real x of sufficiently high Turing degree), L[x] satisfies OD-determinacy (that is determinacy of games on integers of length ω and ordinal-definable payoff), and in HOD^{L[x]} $\omega_2^{L[x]}$ is a Woodin cardinal.

=== Projective determinacy ===
If there are infinitely many Woodin cardinals, then projective determinacy holds; that is, every game whose winning condition is a projective set is determined. From projective determinacy it follows that, for every natural number n, there is a transitive inner model that satisfies that there are n Woodin cardinals.

=== Axiom of determinacy ===
The axiom of determinacy, or AD, asserts that every two-player game of perfect information of length ω, in which the players play naturals, is determined.

AD is provably false from ZFC; using the axiom of choice one may prove the existence of a non-determined game. However, if there are infinitely many Woodin cardinals with a measurable above them all, then L(R) is a model of ZF that satisfies AD.

== Consequences of determinacy ==
=== Regularity properties for sets of reals ===
If A is a subset of Baire space such that the Banach–Mazur game for A is determined, then either II has a winning strategy, in which case A is meager, or I has a winning strategy, in which case A is comeager on some open neighborhood.

This does not quite imply that A has the property of Baire, but it comes close: A simple modification of the argument shows that if Γ is an adequate pointclass such that every game in Γ is determined, then every set of reals in Γ has the property of Baire.

In fact this result is not optimal; by considering the unfolded Banach–Mazur game we can show that determinacy of Γ (for Γ with sufficient closure properties) implies that every set of reals that is the projection of a set in Γ has the property of Baire. So for example the existence of a measurable cardinal implies Π^{1}_{1} determinacy, which in turn implies that every Σ^{1}_{2} set of reals has the property of Baire.

By considering other games, we can show that Π^{1}_{n} determinacy implies that every Σ^{1}_{n+1} set of reals has the property of Baire, is Lebesgue measurable (in fact universally measurable) and has the perfect set property.

=== Periodicity theorems ===
- The first periodicity theorem implies that, for every natural number n, if Δ^{1}_{2n+1} determinacy holds, then Π^{1}_{2n+1} and Σ^{1}_{2n+2} have the prewellordering property (and that Σ^{1}_{2n+1} and Π^{1}_{2n+2} do not have the prewellordering property, but rather have the separation property).
- The second periodicity theorem implies that, for every natural number n, if Δ^{1}_{2n+1} determinacy holds, then Π^{1}_{2n+1} and Σ^{1}_{2n} have the scale property. In particular, if projective determinacy holds, then every projective relation has a projective uniformization.
- The third periodicity theorem gives a sufficient condition for a game to have a definable winning strategy.

=== Applications to decidability of certain second-order theories ===
In 1969, Michael O. Rabin proved that the monadic second-order theory of n successors (S2S for n = 2) is decidable. A key component of the proof requires showing determinacy of parity games, which lie in the third level of the Borel hierarchy.

=== Wadge determinacy ===
Wadge determinacy is the statement that for all pairs A, B of subsets of Baire space, the Wadge game G(A, B) is determined. Similarly for a pointclass Γ, Γ Wadge determinacy is the statement that for all sets A, B in Γ, the Wadge game G(A, B) is determined.

Wadge determinacy implies the semilinear ordering principle for the Wadge order. Another consequence of Wadge determinacy is the perfect set property.

In general, Γ Wadge determinacy is a consequence of the determinacy of Boolean combinations of sets in Γ. In the projective hierarchy, Π^{1}_{1} Wadge determinacy is equivalent to Π^{1}_{1} determinacy, as proved by Leo Harrington. This result was extended by Hjorth to prove that Π^{1}_{2} Wadge determinacy (and in fact the semilinear ordering principle for Π^{1}_{2}) already implies Π^{1}_{2} determinacy.

== More general games ==
=== Games in which the objects played are not natural numbers ===
Determinacy of games on ordinals with ordinal definable payoff and length ω implies that for every regular cardinal κ>ω there are no ordinal definable disjoint stationary subsets of κ made of ordinals of cofinality ω. The consistency strength of the determinacy hypothesis is unknown but is expected to be very high.

=== Long games ===
Existence of ω_{1} Woodin cardinals implies that for every countable ordinal α, all games on integers of length α and projective payoff are determined. Roughly speaking, α Woodin cardinals corresponds to determinacy of games on reals of length α (with a simple payoff set). Assuming a limit of Woodin cardinals κ with o(κ)=κ^{++} and ω Woodin cardinals above κ, games of variable countable length where the game ends as soon as its length is admissible relative to the line of play and with projective payoff are determined. Assuming that a certain iterability conjecture is provable, existence of a measurable Woodin cardinal implies determinacy of open games of length ω_{1} and projective payoff. (In these games, a winning condition for the first player is triggered at a countable stage, so the payoff can be coded as a set of reals.)

Relative to a Woodin limit of Woodin cardinals and a measurable above them, it is consistent that every game on integers of length ω_{1} and ordinal definable payoff is determined. It is conjectured that the determinacy hypothesis is equiconsistent with a Woodin limit of Woodin cardinals. ω_{1} is maximal in that there are undetermined games on integers of length ω_{1}+ω and ordinal definable payoff.

=== Games of imperfect information ===
In any interesting game with imperfect information, a winning strategy will be a mixed strategy: that is, it will give some probability of differing responses to the same situation. If both players' optimal strategies are mixed strategies then the outcome of the game cannot be certainly determinant (as it can for pure strategies, since these are deterministic). But the probability distribution of outcomes to opposing mixed strategies can be calculated. A game that requires mixed strategies is defined as determined if a strategy exists that yields a minimum expected value (over possible counter-strategies) that exceeds a given value. Against this definition, all finite two-player zero-sum games are clearly determined. However, the determinacy of infinite games of imperfect information (Blackwell games) is less clear.

In 1969 David Blackwell proved that some "infinite games with imperfect information" (now called "Blackwell games") are determined, and in 1998 Donald A. Martin proved that ordinary (perfect-information game) determinacy for a boldface pointclass implies Blackwell determinacy for the pointclass. This, combined with the Borel determinacy theorem of Martin, implies that all Blackwell games with Borel payoff functions are determined. Martin conjectured that ordinary determinacy and Blackwell determinacy for infinite games are equivalent in a strong sense (i.e. that Blackwell determinacy for a boldface pointclass in turn implies ordinary determinacy for that pointclass), but as of 2010, it has not been proven that Blackwell determinacy implies perfect-information-game determinacy.

== See also ==
- ω-automaton
- Solved game
- Strictly determined game
- Topological game

== Footnotes ==
1. This assumes that I is trying to get the intersection of neighborhoods played to be a singleton whose unique element is an element of A. Some authors make that the goal instead for player II; that usage requires modifying the above remarks accordingly.
