= Uniformization (set theory) =

In set theory, a branch of mathematics, the axiom of uniformization is a weak form of the axiom of choice. It states that if $R$ is a subset of $X\times Y$, where $X$ and $Y$ are Polish spaces, then there is a subset $f$ of $R$ that is a partial function from $X$ to $Y$, and whose domain (the set of all $x$ such that $f(x)$ exists) equals

$$\{x \in X \mid \exists y \in Y: (x,y) \in R\}\,$$

Such a function is called a uniformizing function for $R$, or a uniformization of $R$.

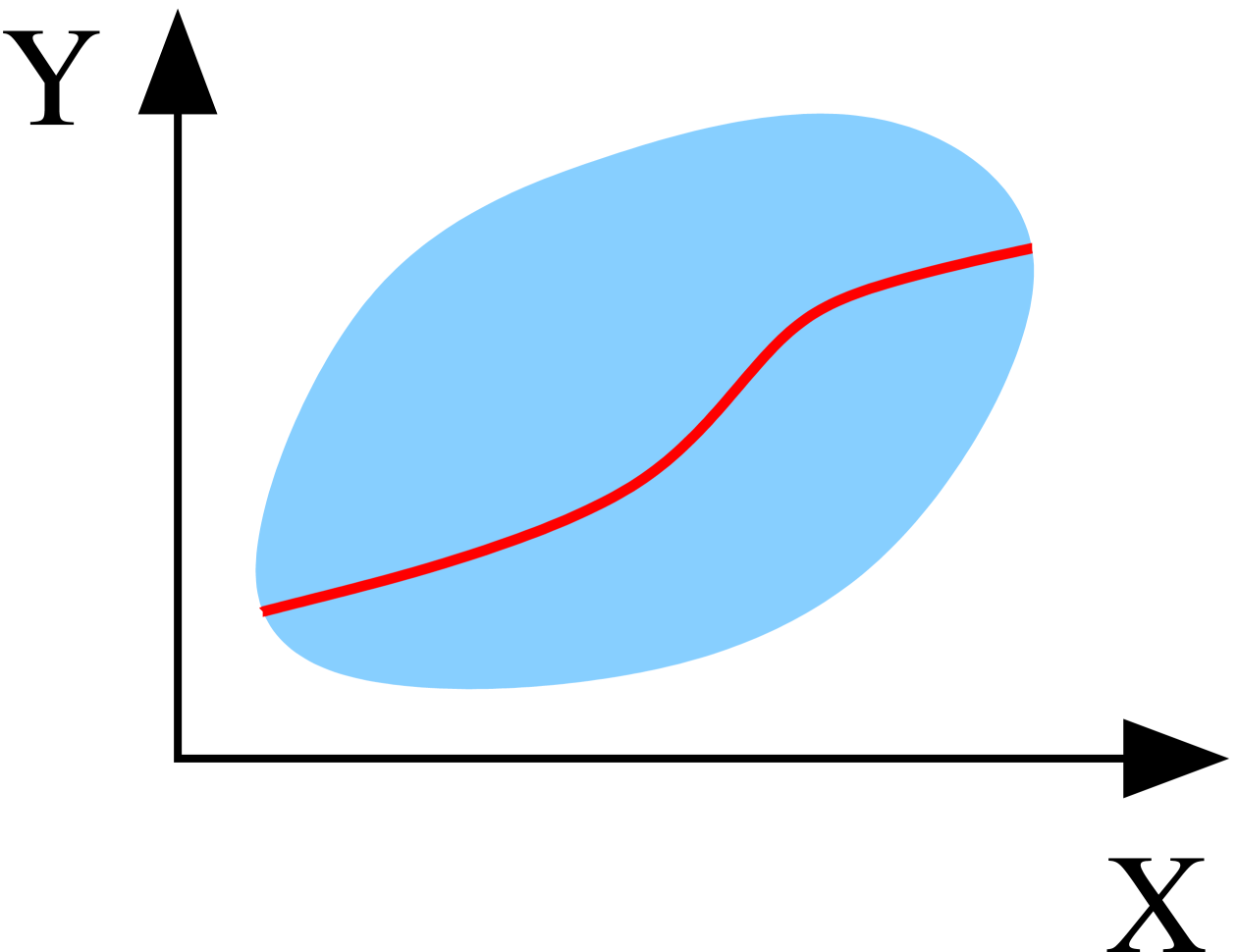
Uniformization of relation R (light blue) by function f (red).

To see the relationship with the axiom of choice, observe that $R$ can be thought of as associating, to each element of $X$, a subset of $Y$. A uniformization of $R$ then picks exactly one element from each such subset, whenever the subset is non-empty. Thus, allowing arbitrary sets X and Y (rather than just Polish spaces) would make the axiom of uniformization equivalent to the axiom of choice.

A pointclass $\boldsymbol{\Gamma}$ is said to have the uniformization property if every relation $R$ in $\boldsymbol{\Gamma}$ can be uniformized by a partial function in $\boldsymbol{\Gamma}$. The uniformization property is implied by the scale property, at least for adequate pointclasses of a certain form.

It follows from ZFC alone that $\boldsymbol{\Pi}^1_1$ and $\boldsymbol{\Sigma}^1_2$ have the uniformization property. It follows from the existence of sufficient large cardinals that

- $\boldsymbol{\Pi}^1_{2n+1}$ and $\boldsymbol{\Sigma}^1_{2n+2}$ have the uniformization property for every natural number $n$.
- Therefore, the collection of projective sets has the uniformization property.
- Every relation in L(R) can be uniformized, but not necessarily by a function in L(R). In fact, L(R) does not have the uniformization property (equivalently, L(R) does not satisfy the axiom of uniformization).
  - (Note: it's trivial that every relation in L(R) can be uniformized in V, assuming V satisfies the axiom of choice. The point is that every such relation can be uniformized in some transitive inner model of V in which the axiom of determinacy holds.)
