= Adequate pointclass =

In the mathematical field of descriptive set theory, a pointclass can be called adequate if it contains all recursive pointsets and is closed under recursive substitution, bounded universal and existential quantification and preimages by recursive functions. This ensures that an adequate pointclass is robust enough to include computable sets and remain stable under fundamental operations, making it a key tool for studying the complexity and definability of sets in effective descriptive set theory.
