= Axiom of determinacy =

Possible axiom for set theory

In mathematics, the axiom of determinacy (abbreviated as AD) is a possible axiom for set theory introduced by Jan Mycielski and Hugo Steinhaus in 1962. It refers to certain two-person topological games of length ω. AD states that every game of a certain type is determined; that is, one of the two players has a winning strategy.

Steinhaus and Mycielski's motivation for AD was its interesting consequences, and suggested that AD could be true in the smallest natural model L(R) of a set theory, which accepts only a weak form of the axiom of choice (AC) but contains all real and all ordinal numbers. Some consequences of AD followed from theorems proved earlier by Stefan Banach and Stanisław Mazur, and Morton Davis. Mycielski and Stanisław Świerczkowski contributed another one: AD implies that all sets of real numbers are Lebesgue measurable. Later Donald A. Martin and others proved more important consequences, especially in descriptive set theory. In 1988, John R. Steel and W. Hugh Woodin concluded a long line of research. Assuming the existence of some uncountable cardinal numbers analogous to ℵ_{0}, they proved the original conjecture of Mycielski and Steinhaus that AD is true in L(R).

== Types of games that are determined ==
The axiom of determinacy refers to games of the following specific form: Consider a subset A of the Baire space ω^{ω} of all infinite sequences of natural numbers. Two players alternately pick natural numbers

n_{0}, n_{1}, n_{2}, n_{3}, ...

That generates the sequence ⟨n_{i}⟩_{i∈ω} after infinitely many moves. The player who picks first wins the game if and only if the sequence generated is an element of A. The axiom of determinacy is the statement that all such games are determined.

Not all games require the axiom of determinacy to prove them determined. If the set A is clopen, the game is essentially a finite game, and is therefore determined. Similarly, if A is a closed set, then the game is determined. By the Borel determinacy theorem, games whose winning set is a Borel set are determined. It follows from the existence of sufficiently large cardinals that AD holds in L(R) and that a game is determined if it has a projective set as its winning set (see Projective determinacy).

The axiom of determinacy implies that for every subspace X of the real numbers, the Banach–Mazur game BM(X) is determined, and consequently, that every set of reals has the property of Baire.

== Incompatibility with the axiom of choice ==
Under assumption of the axiom of choice, we present two separate constructions of counterexamples to the axiom of determinacy. It follows that the axiom of determinacy and the axiom of choice are incompatible.

=== Using a well-ordering of the continuum ===
The set S_{1} of all first player strategies in an ω-game G has the same cardinality as the continuum. The same is true for the set S_{2} of all second player strategies. Let SG be the set of all possible sequences in G, and A be the subset of sequences of SG that make the first player win. With the axiom of choice we can well order the continuum, and we can do so in such a way that any proper initial portion has lower cardinality than the continuum. We use the obtained well ordered set J to index both S_{1} and S_{2}, and construct A such that it will be a counterexample.

We start with empty sets A and B. Let α ∈ J be the index of the strategies in S_{1} and S_{2}. We need to consider all strategies S_{1} = {s_{1}(α)}_{α∈J} of the first player and all strategies S_{2} = {s_{2}(α)}_{α∈J} of the second player to make sure that for every strategy there is a strategy of the other player that wins against it. For every strategy of the player considered we will generate a sequence that gives the other player a win. Let t be the time whose axis has length ℵ_{0} and which is used during each game sequence. We create the counterexample A by transfinite recursion on α:

1. Consider the strategy s_{1}(α) of the first player.
2. Apply this strategy on an ω-game, generating (together with the other player's strategy) s_{1}(α)) a sequence ⟨a_{1}, b_{2}, a_{3}, b_{4}, ...,a_{t}, b_{t+1}, ...⟩, which does not belong to A. This is possible, because the number of choices for ⟨b_{2}, b_{4}, b_{6}, ...⟩ has the same cardinality as the continuum, which is larger than the cardinality of the proper initial portion { β ∈ J | β < α } of J.
3. Add this sequence to B to indicate that s_{1}(α) loses (on ⟨b_{2}, b_{4}, b_{6}, ...⟩).
4. Consider the strategy s_{2}(α) of the second player.
5. Apply this strategy on an ω-game, generating (together with the other player's strategy) s_{2}(α)) a sequence ⟨a_{1}, b_{2}, a_{3}, b_{4}, ..., a_{t}, b_{t+1}, ...⟩, which does not belong to B. This is possible, because the number of choices for ⟨a_{1}, a_{3}, a_{5}, ...⟩ has the same cardinality as the continuum, which is larger than the cardinality of the proper initial portion { β ∈ J | β ≤ α } of J.
6. Add this sequence to A to indicate that s_{2}(α) loses (on ⟨a_{1}, a_{3}, a_{5}, ...⟩).
7. Process all possible strategies of S_{1} and S_{2} with transfinite induction on α. For all sequences that are not in A or B after that, decide arbitrarily whether they belong to A or to B, so that B is the complement of A.

Once this has been done, prepare for an ω-game G. For a given strategy s_{1} of the first player, there is an α ∈ J such that s_{1} = s_{1}(α), and A has been constructed such that s_{1}(α) fails (on certain choices ⟨b_{2}, b_{4}, b_{6}, ...⟩ of the second player). Hence, s_{1} fails. Similarly, any other strategy of either player also fails.

=== Using a choice function ===
In this construction, the use of the axiom of choice is similar to the choice of socks as stated in the quote by Bertrand Russell.

In a ω-game, the two players are generating the sequence ⟨a_{1}, b_{2}, a_{3}, b_{4}, ...⟩, an element in ω^{ω}, where our convention is that 0 is not a natural number, hence neither player can choose it. Define the function f: ω^{ω} → {0, 1}^{ω} such that f(r) is the unique sequence of length ω with values in {0, 1} whose first term equals 0, and whose sequence of runs (see run-length encoding) equals r. (Such an f can be shown to be injective. The image is the subset of {0, 1}^{ω} of sequences that start with 0 and that are not eventually constant. Formally, f is the Minkowski question mark function, {0, 1}^{ω} is the Cantor space and ω^{ω} is the Baire space.)

Observe the equivalence relation on {0, 1}^{ω} such that two sequences are equivalent if and only if they differ in a finite number of terms. This partitions the set into equivalence classes. Let T be the set of equivalence classes (such that T has the cardinality of the continuum). Define g: {0, 1}^{ω} → T that takes a sequence to its equivalence class. Define the complement of any sequence s in {0, 1}^{ω} to be the sequence s_{1} that differs in each term. Define the function h: T → T such that for any sequence s in {0, 1}^{ω}, h applied to the equivalence class of s equals the equivalence class of the complement of s (which is well-defined because if s and s' are equivalent, then their complements are equivalent). One can show that h is an involution with no fixed points, and thus we have a partition of T into size-2 subsets such that each subset is of the form {t, h(t)}. Using the axiom of choice, we can choose one element out of each subset. In other words, we are choosing "half" of the elements of T, a subset that we denote by U (where U ⊆ T) such that t ∈ U iff h(t) ∉ U.

Next, we define the subset A ⊆ ω^{ω} in which 1 wins: A is the set of all r such that g(f(r)) ∈ U. We now claim that neither player has a winning strategy, using a strategy-stealing argument. Denote the current game state by a finite sequence of natural numbers (so that if the length of this sequence is even, then 1 is next to play; otherwise 2 is next to play).

Suppose that q is a (deterministic) winning strategy for 2. Player 1 can construct a strategy p that beats q as follows: Suppose that player 2's response (according to q) to ⟨1⟩ is b_{1}. Then 1 specifies in p that a_{1} = 1 + b_{1}. (Roughly, 1 is now playing as 2 in a second parallel game; 1's winning set in the second game equals 2's winning set in the original game, and this is a contradiction. Nevertheless, we continue more formally.)

Suppose that 2's response (always according to q) to ⟨1 + b_{1}⟩ is b_{2}, and 2's response to ⟨1, b_{1}, b_{2}⟩ is b_{3}. In constructing p for 1, we only aim to beat q, and therefore only have to handle the response b_{2} to 1's first move. Therefore, set b_{3} as 1's response to ⟨1 + b_{1}, b_{2}⟩. In general, for even n, denote 2's response to ⟨1 + b_{1}, ..., b_{n−1}⟩ by b_{n} and 2's response to ⟨1, b_{1}, ..., b_{n}⟩ by b_{n+1}. Then we specify in p that 1's response to ⟨1 + b_{1}, b_{2}, ..., b_{n}⟩ is b_{n+1}. Strategy q is presumed to be winning, and game-result r in ω^{ω} given by ⟨1, b_{1}, ...⟩ is one possible sequence allowed by q, so r must be winning for 2 and g(f(r)) must not be in U. The game result r' in ω^{ω} given by ⟨1 + b_{1}, b_{2}, ...⟩ is also a sequence allowed by q (specifically, q playing against p), so g(f(r')) must not be in U. However, f(r) and f(r') differ in all but the first term (by the nature of run-length encoding and an offset of 1), so f(r) and f(r') are in complement equivalent classes, so g(f(r)), g(f(r')) cannot both be in U, contradicting the assumption that q is a winning strategy.

Similarly, suppose that p is a winning strategy for 1; the argument is similar but now uses the fact that equivalence classes were defined by allowing an arbitrarily large finite number of terms to differ. Let a_{1} be 1's first move. In general, for even n, denote 1's response to ⟨a_{1}, 1⟩ (if n = 2) or ⟨a_{1}, 1, a_{2}, ..., a_{n−1}⟩ by a_{n} and 1's response to ⟨a_{1}, 1 + a_{2}, ... a_{n}⟩ by a_{n+1}. Then the game result r given by ⟨a_{1}, 1, a_{2}, a_{3}, ...⟩ is allowed by p so that g(f(r)) must be in U; also the game result r' given by ⟨a_{1}, 1 + a_{2}, a_{3}, ...⟩ is also allowed by p so that g(f(r')) must be in U. However, f(r) and f(r') differ in all but the first a_{1} + 1 terms, so they are in complement equivalent classes, therefore g(f(r)) and g(f(r')) cannot both be in U, contradicting that p is a winning strategy.

== Large cardinals and the axiom of determinacy ==
The consistency of the axiom of determinacy is closely related to the question of the consistency of large cardinal axioms. By a theorem of Woodin, the consistency of Zermelo–Fraenkel set theory without choice (ZF) together with the axiom of determinacy is equivalent to the consistency of Zermelo–Fraenkel set theory with choice (ZFC) together with the existence of infinitely many Woodin cardinals. Since Woodin cardinals are strongly inaccessible, if AD is consistent, then so are an infinity of inaccessible cardinals.

Moreover, if to the hypothesis of an infinite set of Woodin cardinals is added the existence of a measurable cardinal larger than all of them, a very strong theory of Lebesgue measurable sets of reals emerges, as it is then provable that the axiom of determinacy is true in L(R), and therefore that every set of real numbers in L(R) is determined.

== Projective ordinals ==
Yiannis Moschovakis introduced the ordinals δ^{1}_{n}, which is the upper bound of the length of Δ^{1}_{n}-norms (injections of a Δ^{1}_{n} set into the ordinals), where Δ^{1}_{n} is a level of the projective hierarchy. Assuming AD, all δ^{1}_{n} are initial ordinals, and we have δ^{1}_{2n+2} = (δ^{1}_{2n+1})^{+}, and for n < ω, the 2n-th Suslin cardinal is equal to δ^{1}_{2n−1}.

== See also ==
- AD+
- Axiom of real determinacy (AD_{R})
- Borel determinacy theorem
- Martin measure
- Topological game
