= Prewellordering =

Set theory concept

Transitive binary relations

	Symmetric	Antisymmetric	Connected	Well-founded	Has joins	Has meets	Reflexive	Irreflexive	Asymmetric
			Total, Semiconnex					Anti- reflexive
Equivalence relation	✓	✗	✗	✗	✗	✗	✓	✗	✗
Preorder (Quasiorder)	✗	✗	✗	✗	✗	✗	✓	✗	✗
Partial order	✗	✓	✗	✗	✗	✗	✓	✗	✗
Total preorder	✗	✗	✓	✗	✗	✗	✓	✗	✗
Total order	✗	✓	✓	✗	✗	✗	✓	✗	✗
Prewellordering	✗	✗	✓	✓	✗	✗	✓	✗	✗
Well-quasi-ordering	✗	✗	✗	✓	✗	✗	✓	✗	✗
Well-ordering	✗	✓	✓	✓	✗	✗	✓	✗	✗
Lattice	✗	✓	✗	✗	✓	✓	✓	✗	✗
Join-semilattice	✗	✓	✗	✗	✓	✗	✓	✗	✗
Meet-semilattice	✗	✓	✗	✗	✗	✓	✓	✗	✗
Strict partial order	✗	✓	✗	✗	✗	✗	✗	✓	✓
Strict weak order	✗	✓	✗	✗	✗	✗	✗	✓	✓
Strict total order	✗	✓	✓	✗	✗	✗	✗	✓	✓
	Symmetric	Antisymmetric	Connected	Well-founded	Has joins	Has meets	Reflexive	Irreflexive	Asymmetric
Definitions, for all $a, b$ and $S\neq\varnothing :$	$$\begin{align}&aRb \\ \Rightarrow{} &bRa\end{align}$$	$$\begin{align}aRb\text{ and }&bRa \\ \Rightarrow a ={} &b\end{align}$$	$$\begin{align}a \neq{} &b \Rightarrow \\ aRb\text{ or }&bRa\end{align}$$	$$\begin{align}\min S \\ \text{exists}\end{align}$$	$$\begin{align}a \vee b \\ \text{exists}\end{align}$$	$$\begin{align}a \wedge b \\ \text{exists}\end{align}$$	$aRa$	$\text{not }aRa$	$$\begin{align}aRb \Rightarrow \\ \text{not }bRa\end{align}$$

✓ indicates that the column's property is always true for the row's term (at the very left), while ✗ indicates that the property is not guaranteed in general (it might, or might not, hold). For example, that every equivalence relation is symmetric, but not necessarily antisymmetric, is indicated by ✓ in the "Symmetric" column and ✗ in the "Antisymmetric" column, respectively.

All definitions tacitly require the homogeneous relation $R$ be transitive: for all $a, b, c,$ if $aRb$ and $bRc$ then $aRc.$
A term's definition may require additional properties that are not listed in this table.

In set theory, a prewellordering on a set $X$ is a preorder $\leq$ on $X$ (a transitive and reflexive relation on $X$) that is strongly connected (meaning that any two points are comparable) and well-founded in the sense that the induced relation $x < y$ defined by $x \leq y \text{ and } y \nleq x$ is a well-founded relation.

== Prewellordering on a set ==
A prewellordering on a set $X$ is a homogeneous binary relation $\,\leq\,$ on $X$ that satisfies the following conditions:

1. Reflexivity: $x \leq x$ for all $x \in X.$
2. Transitivity: if $x < y$ and $y < z$ then $x < z$ for all $x, y, z \in X.$
3. Total/Strongly connected: $x \leq y$ or $y \leq x$ for all $x, y \in X.$
4. for every non-empty subset $S \subseteq X,$ there exists some $m \in S$ such that $m \leq s$ for all $s \in S.$
  - This condition is equivalent to the induced strict preorder $x < y$ defined by $x \leq y$ and $y \nleq x$ being a well-founded relation.

A homogeneous binary relation $\,\leq\,$ on $X$ is a prewellordering if and only if there exists a surjection $\pi : X \to Y$ into a well-ordered set $(Y, \lesssim)$ such that for all $x, y \in X,$ $x \leq y$ if and only if $\pi(x) \lesssim \pi(y).$

=== Examples ===
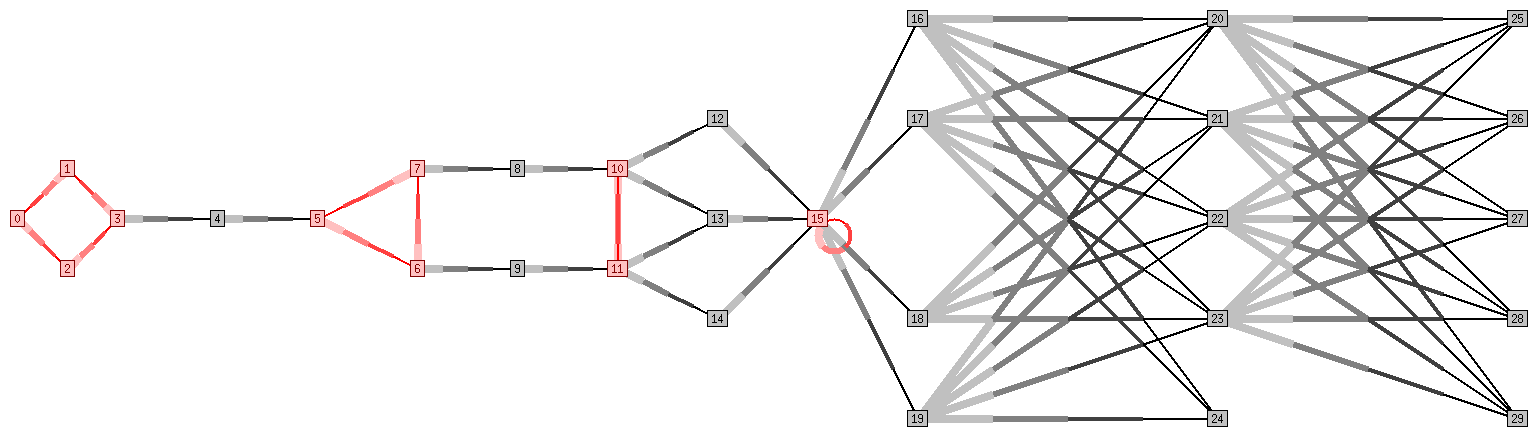
Hasse diagram of the prewellordering $\lfloor x/4\rfloor \leq \lfloor y/5\rfloor$ on the non-negative integers, shown up to 29. Cycles are indicated in red and $\lfloor \cdot\rfloor$ denotes the floor function.

Hasse diagram of the prewellordering $\lfloor x/4\rfloor \leq \lfloor y/4\rfloor$ on the non-negative integers, shown up to 18. The associated equivalence relation is $\lfloor x/4\rfloor = \lfloor y/4\rfloor;$ it identifies the numbers in each light red square.

Given a set $A,$ the binary relation on the set $X := \operatorname{Finite}(A)$ of all finite subsets of $A$ defined by $S \leq T$ if and only if $|S| \leq |T|$ (where $|\cdot|$ denotes the set's cardinality) is a prewellordering.

=== Properties ===
If $\leq$ is a prewellordering on $X,$ then the relation $\sim$ defined by $x \sim y \text{ if and only if } x \leq y \land y \leq x$ is an equivalence relation on $X,$ and $\leq$ induces a wellordering on the quotient $X / {\sim}.$ The order-type of this induced wellordering is an ordinal, referred to as the length of the prewellordering.

A norm on a set $X$ is a map from $X$ into the ordinals. Every norm induces a prewellordering; if $\phi : X \to Ord$ is a norm, the associated prewellordering is given by $x \leq y \text{ if and only if } \phi(x) \leq \phi(y)$ Conversely, every prewellordering is induced by a unique regular norm (a norm $\phi : X \to Ord$ is regular if, for any $x \in X$ and any $\alpha < \phi(x),$ there is $y \in X$ such that $\phi(y) = \alpha$).

== Prewellordering property ==
If $\boldsymbol{\Gamma}$ is a pointclass of subsets of some collection $\mathcal{F}$ of Polish spaces, $\mathcal{F}$ closed under Cartesian product, and if $\leq$ is a prewellordering of some subset $P$ of some element $X$ of $\mathcal{F},$ then $\leq$ is said to be a $\boldsymbol{\Gamma}$-prewellordering of $P$ if the relations $<^*$ and $\leq^*$ are elements of $\boldsymbol{\Gamma},$ where for $x, y \in X,$

1. $x <^* y \text{ if and only if } x \in P \land (y \notin P \lor (x \leq y \land y \not\leq x))$
2. $x \leq^* y \text{ if and only if } x \in P \land (y \notin P \lor x \leq y)$

$\boldsymbol{\Gamma}$ is said to have the prewellordering property if every set in $\boldsymbol{\Gamma}$ admits a $\boldsymbol{\Gamma}$-prewellordering.

The prewellordering property is related to the stronger scale property; in practice, many pointclasses having the prewellordering property also have the scale property, which allows drawing stronger conclusions.

=== Examples ===
$\boldsymbol{\Pi}^1_1$ and $\boldsymbol{\Sigma}^1_2$ both have the prewellordering property; this is provable in ZFC alone. Assuming sufficient large cardinals, for every $n \in \omega,$ $\boldsymbol{\Pi}^1_{2n+1}$ and $\boldsymbol{\Sigma}^1_{2n+2}$ have the prewellordering property.

=== Consequences ===
==== Reduction ====
If $\boldsymbol{\Gamma}$ is an adequate pointclass with the prewellordering property, then it also has the reduction property: For any space $X \in \mathcal{F}$ and any sets $A, B \subseteq X,$ $A$ and $B$ both in $\boldsymbol{\Gamma},$ the union $A \cup B$ may be partitioned into sets $A^*, B^*,$ both in $\boldsymbol{\Gamma},$ such that $A^* \subseteq A$ and $B^* \subseteq B.$

==== Separation ====
If $\boldsymbol{\Gamma}$ is an adequate pointclass whose dual pointclass has the prewellordering property, then $\boldsymbol{\Gamma}$ has the separation property: For any space $X \in \mathcal{F}$ and any sets $A, B \subseteq X,$ $A$ and $B$ disjoint sets both in $\boldsymbol{\Gamma},$ there is a set $C \subseteq X$ such that both $C$ and its complement $X \setminus C$ are in $\boldsymbol{\Gamma},$ with $A \subseteq C$ and $B \cap C = \varnothing.$

For example, $\boldsymbol{\Pi}^1_1$ has the prewellordering property, so $\boldsymbol{\Sigma}^1_1$ has the separation property. This means that if $A$ and $B$ are disjoint analytic subsets of some Polish space $X,$ then there is a Borel subset $C$ of $X$ such that $C$ includes $A$ and is disjoint from $B.$

== See also ==
- Descriptive set theory – Subfield of mathematical logic
- Graded poset – partially ordered set equipped with a rank function – a graded poset is analogous to a prewellordering with a norm, replacing a map to the ordinals with a map to the natural numbers
- Scale property – kind of object in descriptive set theory
