= Borel equivalence relation =

In mathematics, a Borel equivalence relation on a Polish space X is an equivalence relation on X that is a Borel subset of X × X (in the product topology).

Given Borel equivalence relations E and F on Polish spaces X and Y respectively, one says that E is Borel reducible to F, in symbols E ≤_{B} F, if and only if there is a Borel function

Θ : X → Y

such that for all x,x' ∈ X, one has

x E x' ⇔ Θ(x) F Θ(x').

Conceptually, if E is Borel reducible to F, then E is "not more complicated" than F, and the quotient space X/E has a lesser or equal "Borel cardinality" than Y/F, where "Borel cardinality" is like cardinality except for a definability restriction on the witnessing mapping.

== Kuratowski's theorem ==
A measure space X is called a standard Borel space if it is Borel-isomorphic to a Borel subset of a Polish space. Kuratowski's theorem then states that two standard Borel spaces X and Y are Borel-isomorphic iff |X| = |Y|.

== See also ==
- Hyperfinite equivalence relation
- Wadge hierarchy – levels of complexity for sets of reals
- Entourage (topology) – Topological space with a notion of uniform properties
