= John R. Steel =

American mathematician (born 1948)

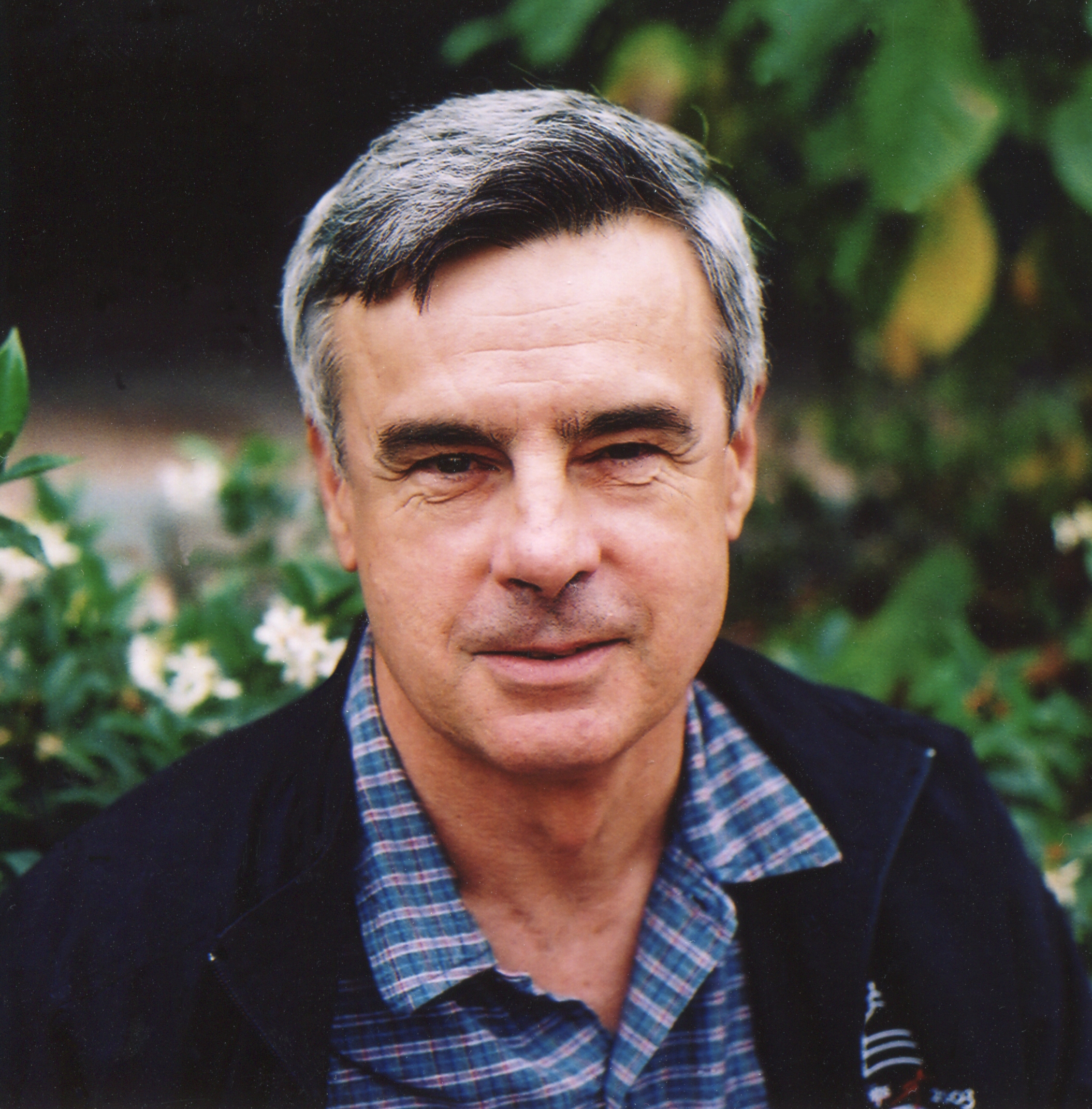
John Steel in 2004

John Robert Steel (born October 30, 1948) is an American set theorist at the University of California, Berkeley (formerly at UCLA). He has made many contributions to the theory of inner models and determinacy. With Donald A. Martin, he proved projective determinacy, assuming the existence of sufficiently large cardinals. He earned his Ph.D. in Logic & the Methodology of Science at Berkeley in 1977 under the joint supervision of John West Addison Jr. and Stephen G. Simpson.

== Awards ==
In 1988, the Association for Symbolic Logic awarded him, Donald A. Martin, and W. Hugh Woodin the Karp Prize for their work on the consistency of determinacy relative to large cardinals. In 2015, the European Set Theory Society awarded him and Ronald Jensen the Hausdorff Medal for their paper "K without the measurable".

In 2012, Steel held the Gödel Lecture titled The hereditarily ordinal definable sets in models of determinacy.
