= Projective determinacy =

In mathematical logic, projective determinacy is the special case of the axiom of determinacy applying only to projective sets.

The axiom of projective determinacy, abbreviated PD, states that for any two-player infinite game of perfect information of length ω in which the players play natural numbers, if the victory set (for either player, since the projective sets are closed under complementation) is projective, then one player or the other has a winning strategy.

The axiom is not a theorem of ZFC (assuming ZFC is consistent), but unlike the full axiom of determinacy (AD), which contradicts the axiom of choice, it is not known to be inconsistent with ZFC. PD follows from certain large cardinal axioms, such as the existence of infinitely many Woodin cardinals.

== Consequences ==
PD implies that all projective sets are Lebesgue measurable (in fact, universally measurable) and have the perfect set property and the property of Baire. It also implies that every projective binary relation may be uniformized by a projective set.

PD implies that for all positive integers $n$, there is a largest countable $\Sigma^1_{2n}$ set.
