= Donald A. Martin =

American mathematician (born 1940)

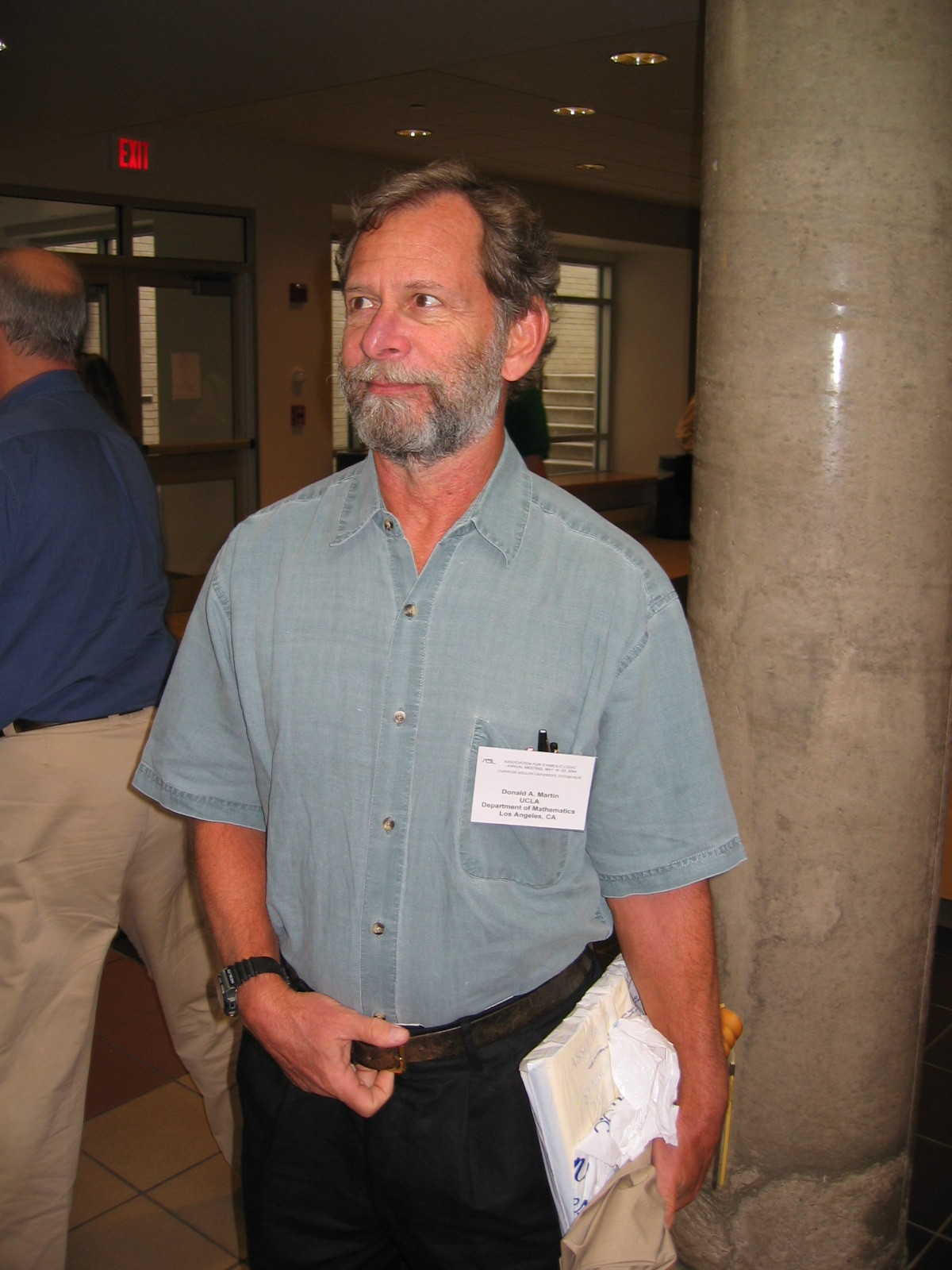
Martin in 2004

Donald Anthony Martin (born December 24, 1940), also known as Tony Martin, is an American set theorist and philosopher of mathematics at UCLA, where he is an emeritus professor of mathematics and philosophy.

== Education and career ==
Martin received his B.S. from the Massachusetts Institute of Technology in 1962 and was a Junior Fellow of the Harvard Society of Fellows in 1965–67. In 2014, he became a Fellow of the American Mathematical Society.

Martin was the 1992 Tarski lecturer.

== Philosophical and mathematical work ==
Among Martin's most notable works are the proofs of analytic determinacy (from the existence of a measurable cardinal), Borel determinacy (from ZFC alone), the proof (with John R. Steel) of projective determinacy (from suitable large cardinal axioms), and his work on Martin's axiom. The Martin measure on Turing degrees and the Martin's Conjecture on Turing invariant functions are also named after Martin.

=== Martin's conjecture ===
In mathematics, more precisely in recursion theory, Martin's conjecture states, in essence, that the only nontrivial definable Turing invariant functions are the Turing jump and its iterates through the transfinite. Martin made this conjecture in the late 1970s; it first appeared in print as item 5 in the list titled “The Victoria Delfino problems” which was published as an appendix to a volume of proceedings of the joint Caltech-UCLA Logic Seminar.

== See also ==
- American philosophy
- List of American philosophers
