= Alpha recursion theory =

Extension of recursion theory to admissible ordinals beyond the natural numbers

In recursion theory, α recursion theory is a generalisation of recursion theory to subsets of admissible ordinals $\alpha$. An admissible set is closed under $\Sigma_1(L_\alpha)$ functions, where $L_\xi$ denotes a rank of Godel's constructible hierarchy. $\alpha$ is an admissible ordinal if $L_{\alpha}$ is a model of Kripke–Platek set theory. In what follows $\alpha$ is considered to be fixed.

== Definitions ==
The objects of study in $\alpha$ recursion theory are subsets of $\alpha$. These sets are said to have some properties:

- A set $A\subseteq\alpha$ is said to be $\alpha$-recursively-enumerable if it is $\Sigma_1$ definable over $L_\alpha$, possibly with parameters from $L_\alpha$ in the definition.
- A is $\alpha$-recursive if both A and $\alpha \setminus A$ (its relative complement in $\alpha$) are $\alpha$-recursively-enumerable. It's of note that $\alpha$-recursive sets are members of $L_{\alpha+1}$ by definition of $L$.
- Members of $L_\alpha$ are called $\alpha$-finite and play a similar role to the finite numbers in classical recursion theory.
- Members of $L_{\alpha+1}$ are called $\alpha$-arithmetic.

There are also some similar definitions for functions mapping $\alpha$ to $\alpha$:

- A partial function from $\alpha$ to $\alpha$ is $\alpha$-recursively-enumerable, or $\alpha$-partial recursive, if and only if its graph is $\Sigma_1$-definable on $(L_\alpha,\in)$.
- A partial function from $\alpha$ to $\alpha$ is $\alpha$-recursive if and only if its graph is $\Delta_1$-definable on $(L_\alpha,\in)$. Like in the case of classical recursion theory, any total $\alpha$-recursively-enumerable function $f:\alpha\rightarrow\alpha$ is $\alpha$-recursive.
- Additionally, a partial function from $\alpha$ to $\alpha$ is $\alpha$-arithmetical if and only if there exists some $n\in\omega$ such that the function's graph is $\Sigma_n$-definable on $(L_\alpha,\in)$.

Additional connections between recursion theory and α recursion theory can be drawn, although explicit definitions may not have yet been written to formalize them:

- The functions $\Delta_0$-definable in $(L_\alpha,\in)$ play a role similar to those of the primitive recursive functions.

We say R is a reduction procedure if it is $\alpha$ recursively enumerable and every member of R is of the form $\langle H,J,K \rangle$ where H, J, K are all α-finite.

A is said to be α-recursive in B if there exist $R_0,R_1$ reduction procedures such that:

$$K \subseteq A \leftrightarrow \exists H: \exists J:[\langle H,J,K \rangle \in R_0 \wedge H \subseteq B \wedge J \subseteq \alpha / B ],$$

$$K \subseteq \alpha / A \leftrightarrow \exists H: \exists J:[\langle H,J,K \rangle \in R_1 \wedge H \subseteq B \wedge J \subseteq \alpha / B ].$$

If A is recursive in B this is written $\scriptstyle A \le_\alpha B$. By this definition A is recursive in $\scriptstyle\varnothing$ (the empty set) if and only if A is recursive. However A being recursive in B is not equivalent to A being $\Sigma_1(L_\alpha[B])$.

We say A is regular if $\forall \beta \in \alpha: A \cap \beta \in L_\alpha$ or in other words if every initial portion of A is α-finite.

== Work in α recursion ==
Shore's splitting theorem: Let A be $\alpha$ recursively enumerable and regular. There exist $\alpha$ recursively enumerable $B_0,B_1$ such that $A=B_0 \cup B_1 \wedge B_0 \cap B_1 = \varnothing \wedge A \not\le_\alpha B_i (i<2).$

Shore's density theorem: Let A, C be α-regular recursively enumerable sets such that $\scriptstyle A <_\alpha C$ then there exists a regular α-recursively enumerable set B such that $\scriptstyle A <_\alpha B <_\alpha C$.

Barwise has proved that the sets $\Sigma_1$-definable on $L_{\alpha^+}$ are exactly the sets $\Pi_1^1$-definable on $L_\alpha$, where $\alpha^+$ denotes the next admissible ordinal above $\alpha$, and $\Sigma$ is from the Lévy hierarchy.

There is a generalization of limit computability to partial $\alpha\to\alpha$ functions.

A computational interpretation of $\alpha$-recursion exists, using "$\alpha$-Turing machines" with a two-symbol tape of length $\alpha$, that at limit computation steps take the limit inferior of cell contents, state, and head position. For admissible $\alpha$, a set $A\subseteq\alpha$ is $\alpha$-recursive if and only if it is computable by an $\alpha$-Turing machine, and $A$ is $\alpha$-recursively-enumerable if and only if $A$ is the range of a function computable by an $\alpha$-Turing machine.

A problem in α-recursion theory which is open (as of 2019) is the embedding conjecture for admissible ordinals, which is whether for all admissible $\alpha$, the automorphisms of the $\alpha$-enumeration degrees embed into the automorphisms of the $\alpha$-enumeration degrees.

== Relationship to analysis ==
Some results in $\alpha$-recursion theory can be translated into similar results about second-order arithmetic. This is because of the relationship $L$ has with the ramified analytic hierarchy, an analog of $L$ for the language of second-order arithmetic that consists of sets of integers.

In fact, when dealing with first-order logic only, the correspondence can be close enough that for some results on $L_\omega$, the arithmetical and Lévy hierarchies can become interchangeable. For example, a set of natural numbers is definable by a $\Sigma_1^0$ formula if and only if it's $\Sigma_1$-definable on $L_\omega$, where $\Sigma_1$ is a level of the Lévy hierarchy. More generally, definability of a subset of ω over $L_\omega$ with a $\Sigma_n$ formula coincides with its arithmetical definability using a $\Sigma_n^0$ formula.
