= Basis theorem =

Basis theorem can refer to:

- Basis theorem (computability), a type of theorem in computability theory showing that sets from particular classes must have elements of particular kinds.
- Hilbert's basis theorem, in algebraic geometry, says that a polynomial ring over a Noetherian ring is Noetherian.
- Low basis theorem, a particular theorem in computability theory.
