= Płatek =

Płatek is a Polish surname, it may refer to:

- Andrew Platek, basketball player North Carolina Tar Heels and Siena Saints
- Andrzej Płatek (pl 1947–2017), Polish footballer and manager
- Artur Płatek (pl, born 1970), Polish footballer and manager
- Dariusz Płatek (born 1966), Polish ice hockey player
- Felka Platek (1899–1944), Polish artist, Auschwitz concentration camp victim
- Krzysztof Płatek (born 1962), Polish athlete
- Monika Płatek (born 1953), Polish criminologist and politician
- Richard Platek, Kripke–Platek set theory
- Robert Platek, Spezia Calcio owner

== Other ==
- Kripke–Platek set theory
  - Kripke–Platek set theory with urelements
