= High (computability) =

In computability theory, a Turing degree [X] is high if it is computable in 0′, and the Turing jump [X′] is 0′′, which is the greatest possible degree in terms of Turing reducibility for the jump of a set which is computable in 0′.

Similarly, a degree is high n if its n'th jump is the (n+1)'st jump of 0. Even more generally, a degree d is generalized high n if its n'th jump is the n'th jump of the join of d with 0′.

== See also ==
- Low (computability)
