= Computably inseparable =

Concept in computability theory

In computability theory, two disjoint sets of natural numbers are called computably inseparable or recursively inseparable if they cannot be "separated" with a computable set. These sets arise in the study of computability theory itself, particularly in relation to $\Pi^0_1$ classes. Computably inseparable sets also arise in the study of Gödel's incompleteness theorem.

== Definition ==
The natural numbers are the set $\mathbb{N} = \{0, 1, 2, \dots\}$. Given disjoint subsets $A$ and $B$ of $\mathbb{N}$, a separating set $C$ is a subset of $\mathbb{N}$ such that $A \subseteq C$ and $B \cap C = \emptyset$ (or equivalently, $A \subseteq C$ and $B \subseteq C'$, where $C' = \mathbb{N} \setminus C$ denotes the complement of $C$). For example, $A$ itself is a separating set for the pair, as is $B'$.

If a pair of disjoint sets $A$ and $B$ has no computable separating set, then the two sets are computably inseparable.

== Examples ==
If $A$ is a non-computable set, then $A$ and its complement are computably inseparable. However, there are many examples of sets $A$ and $B$ that are disjoint, non-complementary, and computably inseparable. Moreover, it is possible for $A$ and $B$ to be computably inseparable, disjoint, and computably enumerable.

- Let $\varphi$ be the standard indexing of the partial computable functions. Then the sets $A = \{ e : \varphi_e(0) = 0 \}$ and $B = \{ e : \varphi_e(0) = 1 \}$ are computably inseparable (William Gasarch1998, p. 1047).
- Let $\#$ be a standard Gödel numbering for the formulas of Peano arithmetic. Then the set $A = \{ \#(\psi) : PA \vdash \psi \}$ of provable formulas and the set $B = \{ \#(\psi) : PA \vdash \lnot\psi \}$ of refutable formulas are computably inseparable. The inseparability of the sets of provable and refutable formulas holds for many other formal theories of arithmetic (Smullyan 1958).
