= True arithmetic =

Set of all true first-order statements about the arithmetic of natural numbers

In mathematical logic, true arithmetic is the set of all true first-order statements about the arithmetic of natural numbers. This is the theory associated with the standard model of the Peano axioms in the language of the first-order Peano axioms. True arithmetic is occasionally called Skolem arithmetic, though this term usually refers to the different theory of natural numbers with multiplication.

== Definition ==
The signature of Peano arithmetic includes the addition, multiplication, and successor function symbols, the equality and less-than relation symbols, and a constant symbol for 0. The (well-formed) formulas of the language of first-order arithmetic are built up from these symbols together with the logical symbols in the usual manner of first-order logic.

The structure $\mathcal{N}$ is defined to be a model of Peano arithmetic as follows.

- The domain of discourse is the set $\mathbb{N}$ of natural numbers,
- The symbol 0 is interpreted as the number 0,
- The function symbols are interpreted as the usual arithmetical operations on $\mathbb{N}$,
- The equality and less-than relation symbols are interpreted as the usual equality and order relation on $\mathbb{N}$.

This structure is known as the standard model or intended interpretation of first-order arithmetic.

A sentence in the language of first-order arithmetic is said to be true in $\mathcal{N}$ if it is true in the structure just defined. The notation $\mathcal{N} \models \varphi$ is used to indicate that the sentence $\varphi$ is true in $\mathcal{N}.$

True arithmetic is defined to be the set of all sentences in the language of first-order arithmetic that are true in $\mathcal{N}$, written Th($\mathcal{N}$). This set is, equivalently, the (complete) theory of the structure $\mathcal{N}$.

== Arithmetic undefinability ==
The central result on true arithmetic is the undefinability theorem of Alfred Tarski (1936). It states that the set Th($\mathcal{N}$) is not arithmetically definable. This means that there is no formula $\varphi(x)$ in the language of first-order arithmetic such that, for every sentence θ in this language,

$$\mathcal{N} \models \theta \quad \text{if and only if} \quad \mathcal{N} \models \varphi(\underline{\#(\theta)}).$$

Here $\underline{\#(\theta)}$ is the numeral of the canonical Gödel number of the sentence θ.

Post's theorem is a sharper version of the undefinability theorem that shows a relationship between the definability of Th($\mathcal{N}$) and the Turing degrees, using the arithmetical hierarchy. For each natural number n, let Th_{n}($\mathcal{N}$) be the subset of Th($\mathcal{N}$) consisting of only sentences that are $\Sigma^0_n$ or lower in the arithmetical hierarchy. Post's theorem shows that, for each n, Th_{n}($\mathcal{N}$) is arithmetically definable, but only by a formula of complexity higher than $\Sigma^0_n$. Thus no single formula can define Th($\mathcal{N}$), because

$$\mbox{Th}(\mathcal{N}) = \bigcup_{n \in \mathbb{N}} \mbox{Th}_n(\mathcal{N})$$

but no single formula can define Th_{n}($\mathcal{N}$) for arbitrarily large n.

== Computability properties ==
As discussed above, Th($\mathcal{N}$) is not arithmetically definable, by Tarski's theorem. A corollary of Post's theorem establishes that the Turing degree of Th($\mathcal{N}$) is 0^{(ω)}, and so Th($\mathcal{N}$) is not decidable nor recursively enumerable.

Th($\mathcal{N}$) is closely related to the theory Th($\mathcal{R}$) of the recursively enumerable Turing degrees, in the signature of partial orders. In particular, there are computable functions S and T such that:

- For each sentence φ in the signature of first-order arithmetic, φ is in Th($\mathcal{N}$) if and only if S(φ) is in Th($\mathcal{R}$).
- For each sentence ψ in the signature of partial orders, ψ is in Th($\mathcal{R}$) if and only if T(ψ) is in Th($\mathcal{N}$).

== Model-theoretic properties ==
True arithmetic is an unstable theory, and so has $2^\kappa$ models for each uncountable cardinal $\kappa$. As there are continuum many types over the empty set, true arithmetic also has $2^{\aleph_0}$ countable models. Since the theory is complete, all of its models are elementarily equivalent.

== True theory of second-order arithmetic ==
The true theory of second-order arithmetic consists of all the sentences in the language of second-order arithmetic that are satisfied by the standard model of second-order arithmetic, whose first-order part is the structure $\mathcal{N}$ and whose second-order part consists of every subset of $\mathbb{N}$.

The true theory of first-order arithmetic, Th($\mathcal{N}$), is a subset of the true theory of second-order arithmetic, and Th($\mathcal{N}$) is definable in second-order arithmetic. However, the generalization of Post's theorem to the analytical hierarchy shows that the true theory of second-order arithmetic is not definable by any single formula in second-order arithmetic.

Simpson (1977) has shown that the true theory of second-order arithmetic is computably interpretable with the theory of the partial order of all Turing degrees, in the signature of partial orders, and vice versa.
