= Csima =

Csima is a surname of Hungarian origin. Notable people with the surname include:

- Barbara Csima, Canadian mathematician
- Douglas Csima, Canadian rower
