= Skolem arithmetic (disambiguation) =

Skolem arithmetic may refer to several distinct types of arithmetic.

- Skolem arithmetic, the arithmetic of positive number with multiplication and equality.
- Primitive recursive arithmetic, a quantifier-free formalization of the natural numbers.
- True arithmetic, the statements true about the standard natural numbers.
