= Carl Jockusch =

American mathematician (born 1941)

Carl Groos Jockusch Jr.
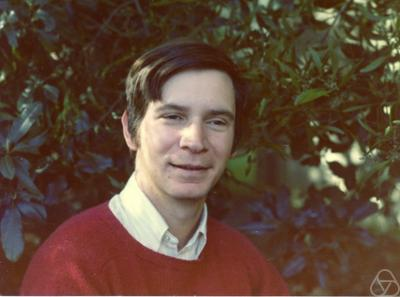
- Carl Jockusch in 1974
- Born: July 13, 1941; San Antonio, Texas, US
- Education: Swarthmore College (BA); Massachusetts Institute of Technology (PhD)
- Spouse: Elizabeth A. Jockusch
- Scientific career
- Thesis: Reducibilities in recursive function theory (1966)
- Doctoral advisor: Hartley Rogers Jr.

Carl Groos Jockusch Jr. (born July 13, 1941, in San Antonio, Texas) is an American mathematician. He graduated from Alamo Heights High School in 1959, attended Vanderbilt University in Nashville, Tennessee, and transferred to Swarthmore College in Pennsylvania in 1960, where he received his B.A. in 1963 with highest honors. He then enrolled at the Massachusetts Institute of Technology. He is a member of Phi Beta Kappa and Sigma Xi. In 2014, he became a Fellow of the American Mathematical Society. He is a professor emeritus at the University of Illinois at Urbana–Champaign.

In 1972 Jockusch and Robert I. Soare proved the low basis theorem, an important result in mathematical logic with applications to recursion theory and reverse mathematics.

== See also ==
- Jockusch–Soare forcing
- Semi-membership
