= KPU =

KPU is an abbreviation that can mean:

- Kenya People's Union, a historic political party in Kenya
- Korea Polytechnic University, South Korea
- Kripke–Platek set theory with urelements, an axiom system for set theory
- Kwantlen Polytechnic University, a public university located in Surrey, British Columbia, Canada.
- Kyoto Prefectural University, Japan
- General Elections Commission (Indonesia), Komisi Pemilihan Umum
- Communist Party of Ukraine, Komunistychna Partiya Ukrayiny
