= Axiom schema of predicative separation =

Schema of axioms in set theory

In axiomatic set theory, the axiom schema of predicative separation, or of restricted, or Δ_{0} separation, is a schema of axioms that is a restriction of the usual axiom schema of separation in Zermelo–Fraenkel set theory. This name Δ_{0} stems from the Lévy hierarchy, in analogy with the arithmetic hierarchy.

== Statement ==
The axiom asserts only the existence of a subset of a set if that subset can be defined without reference to the entire universe of sets. The formal statement of this is the same as full separation schema, but with a restriction on the formulas that may be used: For any formula φ,

$$\forall x \; \exists y \; \forall z \; (z \in y \leftrightarrow z \in x \wedge \varphi(z))$$

provided that φ contains only bounded quantifiers and, as usual, that the variable y is not free in it. So all quantifiers in φ, if any, must appear in the forms

$$\exists u \in v \; \psi(u)$$
$$\forall u \in v \; \psi(u)$$

for some sub-formula ψ and, of course, the definition of $v$ is bound to those rules as well.

=== Motivation ===
This restriction is necessary from a predicative point of view, since the universe of all sets contains the set being defined. If it were referenced in the definition of the set, the definition would be circular.

== Theories ==
The axiom appears in the systems of constructive set theory CST and CZF, as well as in the system of Kripke–Platek set theory.

=== Finite axiomatizability ===
Although the schema contains one axiom for each restricted formula φ, it is possible in CZF to replace this schema with a finite number of axioms.

== See also ==
- Constructive set theory
- Axiom schema of separation
