= Π01 class =

In computability theory, a Π^{0}_{1} class is a subset of 2^{ω} of a certain form. These classes are of interest as technical tools within recursion theory and effective descriptive set theory. They are also used in the application of recursion theory to other branches of mathematics (Cenzer 1999, p. 39).

== Definition ==
The set 2^{<ω} consists of all finite sequences of 0s and 1s, while the set 2^{ω} consists of all infinite sequences of 0s and 1s (that is, functions from ω = {0, 1, 2, ...} to the set {0,1}).

A tree on 2^{<ω} is a subset of 2^{<ω} that is closed under taking initial segments. An element f of 2^{ω} is a path through a tree T on 2^{<ω} if every finite initial segment of f is in T.

A (lightface) Π^{0}_{1} class is a subset C of 2^{ω} for which there is a computable tree T such that C consists of exactly the paths through T. A boldface Π^{0}_{1} class is a subset D of 2^{ω} for which there is an oracle f in 2^{ω} and a subtree tree T of 2^{< ω} computable from f such that D is the set of paths through T.

== As effectively closed sets ==
The boldface Π^{0}_{1} classes are exactly the same as the closed sets of 2^{ω} and thus the same as the boldface Π^{0}_{1} subsets of 2^{ω} in the Borel hierarchy.

Lightface Π^{0}_{1} classes in 2^{ω} (that is, Π^{0}_{1} classes whose tree is computable with no oracle) correspond to effectively closed sets. A subset B of 2^{ω} is effectively closed if there is a recursively enumerable sequence ⟨σ_{i} : i ∈ ω⟩ of elements of 2^{< ω} such that each g ∈ 2^{ω} is in B if and only if there does not exist some i such that σ_{i} is an initial segment of B.

== Relationship with effective theories ==
For each effectively axiomatized theory T of first-order logic, the set of all completions of T is a $\Pi^0_1$ class. Moreover, for each $\Pi^0_1$ subset S of $2^\omega$ there is an effectively axiomatized theory T such that each element of S computes a completion of T, and each completion of T computes an element of S (Jockusch and Soare 1972b).

== See also ==
- Arithmetical hierarchy
- Basis theorem (computability)
