= Robert I. Soare =

American mathematician

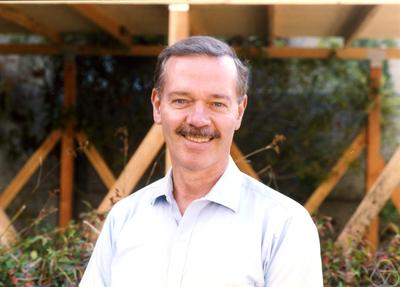
Robert I. Soare

Robert Irving Soare is an American mathematician. He is the Paul Snowden Russell distinguished service professor of mathematics and computer science at the University of Chicago, where he has been on the faculty since 1967. He proved, together with Carl Jockusch, the low basis theorem, and has done other work in mathematical logic, primarily in the area of computability theory. His doctoral students at the University of Chicago have included Barbara Csima.

In 2012 he became a fellow of the American Mathematical Society.

== Selected publications ==
- Soare, R. (2016). Turing Computability - Theory and Applications. Springer-Verlag. ISBN 978-3-642-31932-7.
- Soare, R. (1987). Recursively enumerable sets and degrees. Perspectives in Mathematical Logic. Springer-Verlag. ISBN 3-540-15299-7.
- C. G. Jockusch Jr. and R. I. Soare, "Π(0, 1) Classes and Degrees of Theories" in Transactions of the American Mathematical Society (1972).

== See also ==
- Jockusch–Soare forcing
