= Bounded quantifier =

Logical quantification that ranges over a subset of the universe of discourse

In the study of formal theories in mathematical logic, bounded quantifiers (also known as restricted quantifiers) are often included in a formal language in addition to the standard quantifiers "∀" and "∃". Bounded quantifiers differ from "∀" and "∃" in that bounded quantifiers restrict the range of the quantified variable. The study of bounded quantifiers is motivated by the fact that determining whether a sentence with only bounded quantifiers is true is often not as difficult as determining whether an arbitrary sentence is true.

== Examples ==
Examples of bounded quantifiers in the context of real analysis include:

- $\forall x > 0$ - for all x where x is larger than 0
- $\exists y < 0$ - there exists a y where y is less than 0
- $\forall x \isin \mathbb{R}$ - for all x where x is a real number
- $\forall x > 0 \quad \exists y < 0 \quad (x = y^2)$ - every positive number is the square of a negative number

== Bounded quantifiers in arithmetic ==
Suppose that L is the language of Peano arithmetic (the language of second-order arithmetic or arithmetic in all finite types would work as well). There are two types of bounded quantifiers: $\forall n < t$ and $\exists n < t$. These quantifiers bind the number variable n using a numeric term t not containing n but which may have other free variables. ("Numeric terms" here means terms such as "1 + 1", "2", "2 × 3", "m + 3", etc.)

These quantifiers are defined by the following rules ($\phi$ denotes formulas):

$$\exists n < t\, \phi \Leftrightarrow \exists n ( n < t \land \phi)$$
$$\forall n < t\, \phi \Leftrightarrow \forall n ( n < t \rightarrow \phi)$$

There are several motivations for these quantifiers.

- In applications of the language to computability theory, such as the arithmetical hierarchy, bounded quantifiers add no complexity. If $\phi$ is a decidable predicate then $\exists n < t \, \phi$ and $\forall n < t\, \phi$ are decidable as well.
- In applications to the study of Peano arithmetic, the fact that a particular set can be defined with only bounded quantifiers can have consequences for the computability of the set. For example, there is a definition of primality using only bounded quantifiers: a number n is prime if and only if there are not two numbers strictly less than n whose product is n. There is no quantifier-free definition of primality in the language $\langle 0,1,+,\times, <, =\rangle$, however. The fact that there is a bounded quantifier formula defining primality shows that the primality of each number can be computably decided.

In general, a relation on natural numbers is definable by a bounded formula if and only if it is computable in the linear-time hierarchy, which is defined similarly to the polynomial hierarchy, but with linear time bounds instead of polynomial. Consequently, all predicates definable by a bounded formula are Kalmár elementary, context-sensitive, and primitive recursive.

In the arithmetical hierarchy, an arithmetical formula that contains only bounded quantifiers is called $\Sigma^0_0$, $\Delta^0_0$, and $\Pi^0_0$. The superscript 0 is sometimes omitted.

== Bounded quantifiers in set theory ==
Suppose that L is the language $\langle \in, \ldots, =\rangle$ of the Zermelo–Fraenkel set theory, where the ellipsis may be replaced by term-forming operations such as a symbol for the powerset operation. There are two bounded quantifiers: $\forall x \in t$ and $\exists x \in t$. These quantifiers bind the set variable x and contain a term t which may not mention x but which may have other free variables.

The semantics of these quantifiers is determined by the following rules:

$$\exists x \in t\ (\phi) \Leftrightarrow \exists x ( x \in  t \land \phi)$$
$$\forall x \in t\ (\phi) \Leftrightarrow \forall x ( x \in t \rightarrow \phi)$$

A ZF formula that contains only bounded quantifiers is called $\Sigma_0$, $\Delta_0$, and $\Pi_0$. This forms the basis of the Lévy hierarchy, which is defined analogously with the arithmetical hierarchy.

Bounded quantifiers are important in Kripke–Platek set theory and constructive set theory, where only Δ_{0} separation is included. That is, it includes separation for formulas with only bounded quantifiers, but not separation for other formulas. In KP the motivation is the fact that whether a set x satisfies a bounded quantifier formula only depends on the collection of sets that are close in rank to x (as the powerset operation can only be applied finitely many times to form a term). In constructive set theory, it is motivated on predicative grounds.

== See also ==
- Subtyping — bounded quantification in type theory
- System F_{<:} — a polymorphic typed lambda calculus with bounded quantification
