= Basis theorem (computability) =

In computability theory, there are a number of basis theorems. These theorems show that particular kinds of sets always must have some members that are, in terms of Turing degree, not too complicated. One family of basis theorems concern nonempty effectively closed sets (that is, nonempty $\Pi^0_1$ sets in the arithmetical hierarchy); these theorems are studied as part of classical computability theory. Another family of basis theorems concern nonempty lightface analytic sets (that is, $\Sigma^1_1$ in the analytical hierarchy); these theorems are studied as part of hyperarithmetical theory.

== Effectively closed sets ==
Effectively closed sets are a topic of study in classical computability theory. An effectively closed set is the set of all paths through some computable subtree of the binary tree $2^{<\omega}$. These sets are closed, in the topological sense, as subsets of the Cantor space $2^\omega$, and the complement of an effective closed set is an effective open set in the sense of effective Polish spaces. Kleene proved in 1952 that there is a nonempty, effectively closed set with no computable point (Cooper 1999, p. 134). Basis theorems show that there must be points that are not "too far" from being computable, in an informal sense.

A class $\mathcal{C} \subseteq 2^\omega$ is a basis for effectively closed sets if every nonempty effectively closed set includes a member of $\mathcal{C}$ (Cooper 2003, p. 329). Basis theorems show that particular classes are bases in this sense. These theorems include (Cooper 1999, p. 134):

- The low basis theorem: each nonempty $\Pi^0_1$ set has a member that is of low degree.
- The hyperimmune-free basis theorem: each nonempty $\Pi^0_1$ set has a member that is of hyperimmune-free degree.
- The r.e. basis theorem: each nonempty $\Pi^0_1$ set has a member that is of recursively enumerable (r.e.) degree.

Here, a set $X \subseteq \N$ is low if its Turing jump $X' = \varnothing'$, the degree of the halting problem. $X$ has hyperimmune-free degree if every total $X$-computable function $f\colon \mathbb{N} \to \mathbb{N}$ is dominated by a total computable function $g$ (meaning $f(n) \leq g(n)$ for all $n$).

No two of the above three theorems can be combined for the set of consistent completions of PA (or just EFA; the Turing degrees are the same). The only r.e. Turing degree that computes a consistent completion of PA is 0'. However, the low basis theorem and the hyperimmune-free basis theorem can each be combined with cone avoidance, i.e. for every noncomputable X, we can choose a member (as in the theorem) that does not compute X. The theorems also relativize above an arbitrary real.

== Lightface analytic sets ==
There are also basis theorems for lightface $\Sigma^1_1$ sets. These basis theorems are studied as part of hyperarithmetical theory. One theorem is the Gandy basis theorem, which is analogous to the low basis theorem. The Gandy basis theorem shows that each nonempty $\Sigma^1_1$ set has an element that is hyperarithmetically low, that is its hyperjump has the same hyperdegree (and for the theorem, even the same Turing degree) as Kleene's set $\mathcal{O}$.
