= Kripke–Platek set theory =

System of mathematical set theory

Kripke–Platek set theory (KP) is an axiomatic set theory developed by Saul Kripke and Richard Platek. It is substantially weaker than Zermelo–Fraenkel set theory (ZF); in the usual formulation, KP omits the axiom of power set, and restricts the separation and collection schemes to formulas with only bounded quantifiers. In some formulations, the axiom of infinity is also omitted.

KP is important to admissible set theory, recursion theory, and proof theory. It is used to study relatively weak set theoretic universes, and levels of the constructible universe.

== Axioms ==
In its formulation, a Δ_{0} formula is one all of whose quantifiers are bounded. This means any quantification is the form $\forall u \in v$ or $\exist u \in v.$ (See the Lévy hierarchy.)

- Axiom of extensionality: Two sets are the same if and only if they have the same elements. So a set z which contains one of them x, contains the other y.

$$\forall z \forall y ( \exist x \in z [ \forall w \in x ( w \in y ) \land \forall w \in y ( w \in x ) ] \implies y \in z ) .$$

This axiom is a Π_{1} formula. In light of this axiom, we can define equality by a Δ_{0} formula:

$$x = y \equiv \forall w \in x ( w \in y ) \land \forall w \in y ( w \in x ) .$$

- Axiom of induction: φ(a) being a formula, if for all sets x the assumption that φ(y) holds for all elements y of x entails that φ(x) holds, then φ(x) holds for all sets x.

$$\forall w_1,\ldots,w_n [\forall x ( \forall y \in x \varphi (w_1,\ldots,w_n,y) \implies \varphi (w_1,\ldots,w_n,x) ) \implies \forall x \varphi (w_1,\ldots,w_n,x)] .$$

Depending on the choice of φ, this axiom could be at level Δ_{k} for any k with 2 ≤ k < ω when n = 0 or Π_{k} when n > 0.

- Axiom of empty set: There exists a set with no members, called the empty set and denoted { } or ∅ or 0.

$$\exist x \forall y \in x ( y \notin x ) .$$

This axiom is a Σ_{1} formula. If, as in this case, there is a Δ_{0} formula definiens such that one has a proof that there is one unique set with that property, then we can introduce a symbol(s) for it and use it as a parameter in other Δ_{0} formulas.

- Axiom of pairing: If x, y are sets, then so is {x, y}, a set containing x and y as its only elements.

$$\forall x \forall y \exist z ( x \in z \land y \in z \land \forall w \in z ( w = x \lor w = y ) ) .$$

This axiom is a Π_{2} formula.

- Axiom of union: For any set x, there is a set y such that the elements of y are precisely the elements of the elements of x.

$$\forall x \exist y ( \forall z \in x \forall w \in z ( w \in y ) \land \forall w \in y \exist z \in x ( w \in z ) ) .$$

This axiom is a Π_{2} formula.

- Axiom of Δ_{0}-separation: Given any set and any Δ_{0} formula φ(x), there is a subset of the original set containing precisely those elements x for which φ(x) holds. (This is an axiom schema.)

$$\forall w_1,\ldots,w_n \forall a \exist b [ \forall x \in a ( \varphi (w_1,\ldots,w_n,x) \implies x \in b ) \land \forall x \in b ( x \in a \land \varphi (w_1,\ldots,w_n,x) ) ] .$$

This axiom is a Π_{2} formula.

- Axiom of Δ_{0}-collection: Given any Δ_{0} formula φ(x, y), if for every set x there exists a set y such that φ(x, y) holds, then for all sets X there exists a set Y such that for every x in X there is a y in Y such that φ(x, y) holds.

$$\forall w_1,\ldots,w_n [\forall x \exist y \varphi (w_1,\ldots,w_n,x, y) \implies \forall X \exist Y \forall x \in X \exist y \in Y \varphi (w_1,\ldots,w_n,x, y)] .$$

This axiom is the disjunction of a Σ_{2} formula with a Π_{2} formula, thus it is Δ_{3} when n = 0 or Π_{3} when n > 0.

Some but not all authors include an

- Axiom of infinity

$$\exist w [ \forall n \in w ( n = 0 \lor \exist m \in w ( n = m \cup \{ m \} ) ) \land 0 \in w \land \forall m \in w \exist n \in w ( n = m \cup \{ m \} ) ] .$$

This axiom is a Σ_{1} formula. It defines ω.

KP with infinity is denoted by KPω. These axioms lead to close connections between KP, computability theory, and the theory of admissible ordinals. KP can be studied as a constructive set theory by dropping the law of excluded middle, without changing any axioms.

=== Empty set ===
If any set $c$ is postulated to exist, such as in the axiom of infinity, then the axiom of empty set is redundant because it is equal to the subset $\{x\in c\mid x\neq x\}$. Furthermore, the existence of a member in the universe of discourse, i.e., ∃x(x=x), is implied in certain formulations of first-order logic, in which case the axiom of empty set follows from the axiom of Δ_{0}-separation, and is thus redundant.

=== Comparison with Zermelo–Fraenkel set theory ===
As noted, the above axioms are together weaker than ZFC as they exclude the power set axiom, choice, and sometimes infinity. Also the axioms of separation and collection here are weaker than the corresponding axioms in ZFC because the formulas φ used in these are limited to bounded quantifiers only.

The axiom of induction in the context of KP is stronger than the usual axiom of regularity, which amounts to applying induction to the complement of a set (the class of all sets not in the given set).

=== Opposite of infinity ===
One could add an axiom of finiteness denying the existence of infinite sets. This would amount to saying that the universe is V_{ω}. This could be done by saying that every set has an injection to a natural number (finite ordinal). In formal language:

$\forall s \exist n \exist f\, \Big( \exists k \in n ( n = k \cup \{k\} ) \, \land \, \forall m \in n [m = 0 \, \lor \, \exists k \in n ( m = k \cup \{k\} )] \, \land$

$$\forall t \in s \exist k \in n ( \langle t, k \rangle \in f ) \, \land \, \forall t \in s \forall u \in s ( \exist k \in n [ \langle t, k \rangle \in f \, \land \, \langle u, k \rangle \in f ] \, \implies \, t = u ) \Big) .$$

A key point here is to identify natural numbers without referring to ω, which is one of the infinite sets that we are trying to deny. A natural number is a set that is either empty or a successor, and thus not a limit, and all of whose elements are also natural numbers. The elements of f are ordered pairs. See also the axiom of limitation of size. This axiom is Π_{2}. It implies the axiom of choice (given a set of nonempty sets; apply this to their union; then map each set to its element with the smallest value of f).

== Related definitions ==
- A set $A\,$ is called admissible if it is transitive and $\langle A,\in \rangle$ is a model of Kripke–Platek set theory.
- An ordinal number $\alpha$ is called an admissible ordinal if $L_\alpha$ is an admissible set.
- $L_\alpha$ is called an amenable set if it is a standard model of KP set theory without the axiom of Δ_{0}-collection.

== Theorems ==
=== Admissible sets ===
The ordinal α is an admissible ordinal if and only if α is a limit ordinal and there does not exist a γ < α for which there is a Σ_{1}(L_{α}) mapping from γ onto α. If M is a standard model of KP, then the set of ordinals in M is an admissible ordinal.

=== Cartesian products exist ===
Theorem: If A and B are sets, then there is a set A×B that consists of all ordered pairs (a, b) of elements a of A and b of B.

Proof:

The singleton set with member a, written {a}, is the same as the unordered pair {a, a}, by the axiom of extensionality.

The singleton, the set {a, b}, and then also the ordered pair

$$(a,b) := \{ \{a\}, \{a,b\} \}$$

all exist by pairing. A possible Δ_{0}-formula $\psi (a, b, p)$ expressing that p stands for the pair (a, b) is given by the lengthy

$\exist r \in p\, \big(a \in r\, \land\, \forall x \in r\, (x = a) \big)$

$\land\, \exist s \in p\, \big(a \in s \,\land\, b \in s\, \land\, \forall x \in s\, (x = a \,\lor\, x = b) \big)$

$$\land\, \forall t \in p\, \Big(\big(a \in t\, \land\, \forall x \in t\, (x = a)\big)\, \lor\, \big(a \in t \land b \in t \land \forall x \in t\, (x = a \,\lor\, x = b)\big)\Big).$$

What follows are two steps of collection of sets, followed by a restriction through separation. All results are also expressed using set builder notation.

Firstly, given $b$ and collecting with respect to $A$, some superset of $A\times\{b\} = \{(a,b)\mid a\in A\}$ exists by collection.

The Δ_{0}-formula

$$\exist a \in A \,\psi (a, b, p)$$

grants that just $A\times\{b\}$ itself exists by separation.

If $P$ ought to stand for this collection of pairs $A\times\{b\}$, then a Δ_{0}-formula characterizing it is

$$\forall a \in A\, \exist p \in P\, \psi (a, b, p)\, \land\, \forall p \in P\, \exist a \in A\, \psi (a, b, p) \,.$$

Given $A$ and collecting with respect to $B$, some superset of $\{A\times \{b\} \mid b\in B\}$ exists by collection.

Putting $\exist b \in B$ in front of that last formula and one finds the set $\{A\times \{b\} \mid b\in B\}$ itself exists by separation.

Finally, the desired

$$A\times B := \bigcup \{A\times \{b\} \mid b\in B\}$$

exists by union. Q.E.D.

=== Transitive containment ===
Transitive containment is the principle that every set is contained in some transitive set. It does not hold in certain set theories, such as Zermelo set theory (though its inclusion as an axiom does not add consistency strength).

Theorem: If A is a set, then there exists a transitive set B such that A is a member of B.

Proof:

We proceed by induction on the formula:

$$\phi(A) := \exist B (A \in B \land \bigcup B \subseteq B)$$

Note that $\bigcup B \subseteq B$ is another way of expressing that B is transitive.

The inductive hypothesis then informs us that

$$\forall a \in A \, \exist b(a \in b \land \bigcup b \subseteq b)$$.

If $a \notin A$, then we set $b = \{\}$ which is transitive.

By Δ_{0}-collection, we have:

$$\exist C \, \forall a \in A \, \exist b \in C (a \in b \land \bigcup b \subseteq b)$$

By Δ_{0}-separation, the set $\{c \in C \mid \bigcup c \subseteq c\}$ exists, whose union we call D.

Now D is a union of transitive sets, and therefore itself transitive. And since $A \subseteq D$, we know $D \cup \{A\}$ is also transitive, and further contains A, as required. Q.E.D.

=== Even natural numbers ===
In KPω, we can prove the existence of a set of all even natural numbers. An even number is either zero or the successor of the successor of an even number (or a limit ordinal). The set of even numbers up to some finite stage can be built up using null set, pairing, and union. From the axiom of infinity, we get the existence of ω and its element 2 = {0, 1}. We apply the axiom of foundation to get a function that gives ( k modulo 2 ) for k ≤ n for each n in ω. Then we use Δ_{0}-collection to send ⟨ n, 0 ⟩ to n and everything else to 0. We use Δ_{0}-separation and the mod 2 function to remove any extraneous elements. This leaves us with the set of even natural numbers.

$$\varphi (n) \equiv \exist f ( ( n \notin \omega \implies \langle 0, 0 \rangle \in f ) \land ( n \in \omega \implies \exist v \in 2 \langle n, v \rangle \in f ) \land \forall \langle k, v \rangle \in f ( ( k = 0 \land v = 0 ) \lor \exist j \in k \exist u \in 2 ( u \neq v \land k = j \cup \{ j \} \land \langle j, u \rangle \in f ) ) ) .$$

Consider any set x. Suppose φ (y) holds for all elements y in x. If x is not in ω, let f be { ⟨ 0, 0 ⟩ } = { { { { } } } }, which exists by the axioms of null set and pairing. Likewise if x = 0. If x is a nonzero natural number, then it is the successor of some natural number m that is an element of x. So φ (m) holds and we can take g to be the function whose existence is ensured by that. Then there is some u in 2 such that ⟨ m, u ⟩ is in g. Let v be the element of 2 different from u. Let f = g ∪ { ⟨ x, v ⟩ }. Then f will be a function that satisfies φ (x). Thus by the axiom of induction, we know that φ (x) holds for all sets x. Initial segments of the modulo 2 function are identified by:

$$\operatorname{segmod2} (f) \equiv \forall p \in f \exist k \in \omega \exist v \in 2 ( p = \langle k, v \rangle \land [ ( k = 0 \land v = 0 ) \lor \exist j \in k \exist u \in 2 ( u \neq v \land k = j \cup \{ j \} \land \langle j, u \rangle \in f ) ] ) .$$

== Metalogic ==
The proof-theoretic ordinal of KPω is the Bachmann–Howard ordinal. KP fails to prove some common theorems in set theory, such as the Mostowski collapse lemma.

== See also ==
- Constructible universe
- Admissible ordinal
- Hereditarily countable set
- Kripke–Platek set theory with urelements

== Bibliography ==
- Devlin, Keith J. (1984). Constructibility. Berlin: Springer-Verlag. ISBN 0-387-13258-9.
- Gostanian, Richard (1980). "Constructible Models of Subsystems of ZF". Journal of Symbolic Logic. 45 (2). Association for Symbolic Logic: 237. doi:10.2307/2273185. JSTOR 2273185.
- Kripke, S. (1964), "Transfinite recursion on admissible ordinals", Journal of Symbolic Logic, 29: 161–162, doi:10.2307/2271646, JSTOR 2271646
- Platek, Richard Alan (1966), Foundations of recursion theory, Thesis (Ph.D.)–Stanford University, MR 2615453
