= Admissible set =

In set theory, a discipline within mathematics, an admissible set is a transitive set $A\,$ such that $\langle A,\in \rangle$ is a model of Kripke–Platek set theory (Barwise 1975).

The smallest example of an admissible set is the set of hereditarily finite sets. Another example is the set of hereditarily countable sets.

== See also ==
- Admissible ordinal
