= Turing jump =

Operation in computability theory

In computability theory, the Turing jump or Turing jump operator, named after Alan Turing, is an operation that assigns to each decision problem $X$ a successively harder decision problem $X'$ with the property that $X'$ is not decidable by an oracle machine with an oracle for $X$.

The operator is called a jump operator because it increases the Turing degree of the problem $X$. That is, the problem $X'$ is not Turing-reducible to $X$. Post's theorem establishes a relationship between the Turing jump operator and the arithmetical hierarchy of sets of natural numbers. Informally, given a problem, the Turing jump returns the set of Turing machines that halt when given access to an oracle that solves that problem.

== Definition ==
The Turing jump of $X$ can be thought of as an oracle to the halting problem for oracle machines with an oracle for $X$. Formally, given a set $X$ and a Gödel numbering φ_{i}^{X} of the X-computable functions, the Turing jump $X'$ of $X$ is defined as

$$X'= \{x \mid \varphi_x^X(x) \ \mbox{is defined} \}.$$

The nth Turing jump X^{(n)} is defined inductively by

$$\begin{align}
X^{(0)} &= X,\\
X^{(n+1)} &= X^{(n)}{'}.
\end{align}$$

The ω jump $X^{(\omega)}$ of $X$ is the effective join of the sequence of sets $X^{(n)}$ for $n\geq 0$:

$$X^{(\omega)} = \{p_i^k \mid i \in \mathbb{N} \text{ and } k \in X^{(i)}\},$$

where p_{i} denotes the ith prime.

The notation 0′ or ∅′ is often used for the Turing jump of the empty set. It is read zero-jump or sometimes zero-prime.

Similarly, 0^{(n)} is the nth jump of the empty set. For finite n, these sets are closely related to the arithmetic hierarchy, and is in particular connected to Post's theorem.

The jump can be iterated into transfinite ordinals: there are jump operators $j^\delta$ for sets of natural numbers when $\delta$ is an ordinal that has a code in Kleene's $\mathcal O$ (regardless of code, the resulting jumps are the same by a theorem of Spector), in particular the sets 0^{(α)} for α < ω_{1}^{CK}, where ω_{1}^{CK} is the Church–Kleene ordinal, are closely related to the hyperarithmetic hierarchy. Beyond ω_{1}^{CK}, the process can be continued through the countable ordinals of the constructible universe, using Jensen's work on fine structure theory of Gödel's L. The concept has also been generalized to extend to uncountable regular cardinals.

== Examples ==
- The Turing jump 0′ of the empty set is Turing equivalent to the halting problem.
- For each n, the set 0^{(n)} is m-complete at level $\Sigma^0_n$ in the arithmetical hierarchy (by Post's theorem).
- The set of Gödel numbers of true formulas in the language of Peano arithmetic with a predicate for X is computable from X^{(ω)}.

== Properties ==
- X′ is X-computably enumerable but not X-computable.
- If A is Turing-equivalent to B, then A′ is Turing-equivalent to B′. The converse of this implication is not true.
- (Shore and Slaman, 1999) The function mapping X to X′ is definable in the partial order of the Turing degrees.

Many properties of the Turing jump operator are discussed in the article on Turing degrees.
