= Absolute infinite =

Concept in philosophy and set theory

The absolute infinite is an extension of the idea of infinity proposed by mathematician Georg Cantor. Cantor linked the absolute infinite with God. Some link the absolute infinite to various mathematical properties, including the reflection principle: every property that can be ascribed to the absolute infinite is held by some smaller object.

== History ==
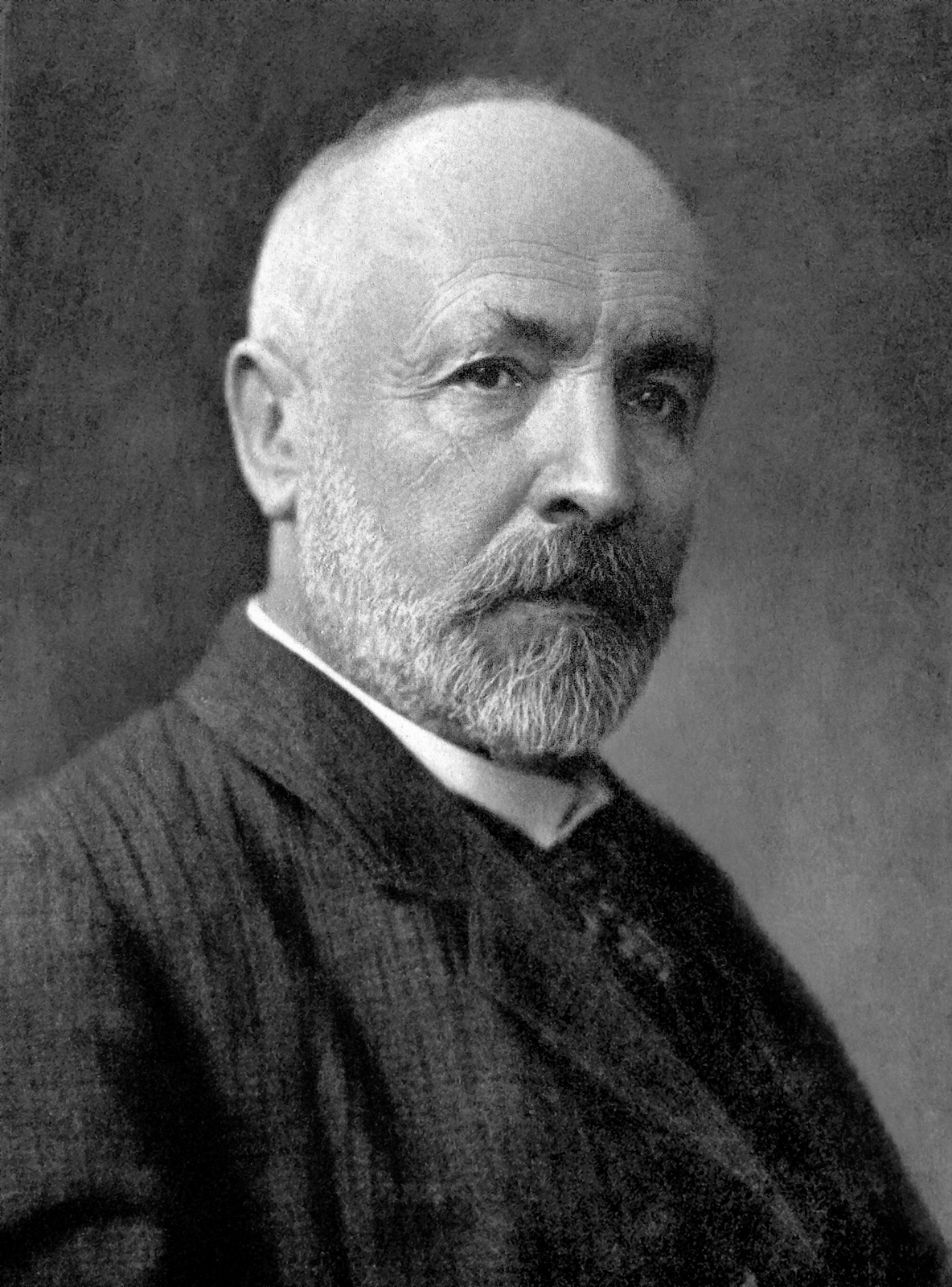
Georg Cantor

During the 1870s–1890s, German mathematician Georg Cantor would publish a series of papers developing his theory of cardinality (Mächtigkeit, magnitude) of infinite sets. In his first paper, On a Property of the Collection of All Real Algebraic Numbers (1874), he proved that it is impossible to put the set of all real numbers on the number line in one-to-one correspondence with the natural numbers, and therefore it must be a strictly larger set, despite the fact that both are infinite. Following this paper, in 1891, he published another paper introducing his diagonal argument—proving that there is an infinite hierarchy of infinites—and cardinal numbers—objects used to represent these possible infinite sizes. His diagonal argument, now called Cantor's theorem, stated that given any set, the powerset (collection of all subsets) must be strictly bigger than the original set. Cantor's proof showed that, given any mapping from the original set to the powerset, one can always construct a new set which was not mapped to by taking the negation of the "diagonal" of the list, thus proving a one-to-one correspondence cannot exist.

=== Paradoxes ===
When the diagonal argument is applied to the collection of all sets or universe of sets, by taking its powerset, one seemingly arrives at a paradox. If the powerset is indeed a set, then it is a subset of the universe of sets, and thus the identity function from the universe to the powerset should be more than enough to cover it, and yet the diagonal argument can show that there is somehow one missing. This set had an interesting character as pointed out by Bertrand Russell in 1901. The mechanism of Cantor's diagonal argument is taking the negation of the "diagonal" of these subsets $D$. For example, the diagonal argument on the mapping $f$ from natural numbers to its powerset says that if 1 is in the first subset of the list $f(1)$, then 1 is not in the subset $D$, and in general, for each natural number $n$, it is put in the subset $D$ only if the nth subset in the list $f(n)$ does not contain the number $n$. So this argument, applied to the universe with the identity mapping gives the set $R$: the collection of all sets that do not contain themselves. Then Russell's paradox asks the question: "does $R$ contain itself?" If yes, then $R$ has the property of not containing itself (by the definition of $R$), and vice versa. Giving the contradiction that $R$ contains itself if and only if it does not contain itself.

In his Beiträge 1897, Cantor published a result on the ordinal numbers. Informally, ordinals generalize the notion of order to infinite sets. For example, 2 comes after 1, denoted $1 < 2$, and 3 comes after both, denoted $1 < 2 < 3$. Then, one defines a new number, $\omega$, which comes after every natural number, denoted $1 < 2 < 3 < \cdots < \omega$. Further $\omega < \omega+1< \dots < \omega+\omega=\omega\cdot 2$, and so on. Specifically, ordinal numbers have the property that, for any set of ordinal numbers, there is always a unique next ordinal: successor or supremum (the order type of the set of all previous ordinals). For example, the set $\{ \omega, \omega\cdot 2, \omega\cdot 3 \cdots\}$ has the unique limit ordinal $\omega^2$; the set $\{ \omega, \omega^2, \omega^3 \cdots\}$ has the limit $\omega^\omega$, and the set of all countable ordinals has the limit $\omega_1$ (the first uncountable ordinal). Cantor's result showed that any collection of ordinal numbers can be well-ordered: the usual notion of order, with the property that any subset of a well-ordered set has a least element. Also in 1897, Cesare Burali-Forti published a paper on a property of ordinal numbers which, unknown to him, contradicted Cantor's result that the ordinal numbers are not a total order—there are ordinal numbers such none of $a<b$, $a=b$, $a>b$ hold—a strictly weaker notion of order than Cantor's theorem, creating what is now called the Burali-Forti paradox. Burali-Forti showed that, when one considers the set of all ordinal numbers $\mathcal O$, by the definition of ordinal numbers, there must be a larger ordinal $\Omega$, and its successor $\Omega+1$. By definition of $\mathcal O$, both $\Omega$ and $\Omega+1$ must be a members of $\mathcal O$. However, since $\Omega$ was defined as the next largest ordinal in $\mathcal O$ it must be that $\Omega+1 \leq \Omega$, contradicting that $\Omega+1$ was a successor. However, it was not until 1903 when Bertrand Russell pointed out the contradiction and published it in his Principles of Mathematics that it became known as a paradox.

=== Early reactions ===
Cantor did not treat these paradoxes as genuine antinomies, but rather limitations of the language used to describe these objects. In his Grundlagen 1883, prior to the discovery of any of these paradoxes, Cantor noticed these kinds of objects (universe of sets, collections of all cardinal or ordinal numbers) and considered them to be a strictly different kind of infinity than that of the cardinal and ordinal numbers. He conceived of two notions of "infinity": the transfinite—the class of infinity dealing with infinite cardinal numbers and ordinal numbers—and the absolute—the notion of infinity beyond psychological or mathematical comprehension, and the size of these kinds of objects:

An essential difference, however, is that I fix the different degrees of the actual-infinite by the numbers [$\aleph_0, \aleph_1, \aleph_2$] etc. once and for all according to that concept and only then do I consider it a task to consider the relationships between them, not only to investigate the numbers mathematically, but also to determine them and record them wherever they occur in nature. There is no doubt for me that we will continue on this path, never reaching an insurmountable boundary, but also not reaching any sort of comprehension of the absolute. The absolute can only be recognized, but never known, not even approximately known.

— Georg Cantor, Grundlagen, 1883 (translated by James Meyer).

Moreover, Cantor used the absolute as a tool in developing his theory of the transfinite. Later, writing to David Hilbert and Richard Dedekind in 1897 and 1899 respectively, Cantor described a paradox similar to Burali-Forti, along with another paradox of cardinal numbers. Cantor showed how, for any set of cardinal numbers, there is always at least one cardinal missing: ordering the set of cardinal numbers, either the maximum cardinal (if there is one) has a powerset, which is strictly greater and thus not included; or if there is no maximum element, then the union of those cardinal numbers must be strictly greater. Thus, following the same reasoning as the Burali-Forti paradox, one could show the set ת of all cardinal numbers produces a similar paradox. In his 1899 letter to Dedekind, Cantor added a list of principles formalizing the notion of "set", which anticipated the axiomatic approach used later, and many of the axioms used, including informal precursors to the axiom of specification (any definable subset is a set), the axiom of replacement and limitation of size (if two collections are equinumerous, then either both are sets or both are inconsistent), and the axiom of union (the union of sets is also a set). Cantor used these axioms in attempt to formalize his notion of the absolute infinite, and prove the well-ordering theorem: that every set has cardinality equivalent to some aleph. Essentially, the argument was, for any set $A$, one could iteratively map elements of the set of all ordinals $\Omega$ into $A$ until either all elements of $A$ had been mapped to and not all ordinals had been used, in which case $A$ is assigned an aleph; or that all elements of $\Omega$ had been used and $A$ has some subset equinumerous with $\Omega$ making the whole collection $A$ inconsistent, contradicting that it was a set.

Hilbert, seeing the letter, could not accept that the set of all alephs is contradictory. Similar to Dedekind, Hilbert believed the fact that the concept of "aleph" being well-defined was enough for the collection of all alephs to be, making Cantor's proof a genuine contradiction. Over the next three years, by the 1900 Paris International Congress of Mathematicians, Hilbert grew to accept Cantor's view of the situation. Unlike Cantor, however, Hilbert did not accept that the way out was through Platonistic faith, but rather he believed the paradoxes were a symptom of the underdeveloped area of logic, and the solution was a more rigorous study of laws of logic in mathematics. Cantor did not publish these paradoxes or the axiomatic definition of set from these letters, and the results would be rediscovered later by other mathematicians. Although Hilbert and some of his followers were prepared for the rediscovery of the paradoxes, the sequence of rediscovery of these paradoxes (along with other results) began an era now known as the foundational crisis of mathematics. Russell rediscovered the paradox of set of all alephs in 1901, though he did not interpret it as a genuine paradox, it nevertheless began a period of serious distrust of Cantor's theorem. During this period, he engaged in more detailed analysis of the paradox, wherein he had begun to formulate the paradox that now bears his name. Between the years 1879 to 1903, logician and philosopher Gottlob Frege had attempted to use Cantors notion cardinality to derive a foundation of arithmetic, ending only when Russell sent a letter to Frege describing his paradox. After initially trying to resolve the paradox, by his death in 1925, he believed his life's work, and set theory as a field to have been "destroyed" by it.

=== Axiomatic resolutions ===
Ernst Zermelo, a follower of Hilbert and Cantor, criticized Cantor's use of "time" in many arguments, such as in his proof of the well-ordering theorem, Cantor assumed he can sequentially "pick out" a new element of a set transfinitely many times. Zermelo's solution to this was a new axiom allowing one to "pick out" these elements all at once, now called the Axiom of Choice. This was published later in his 1908 system of axioms, now called Zermelo set theory (the first axiomatic set theory) where he attempted to prove the well-ordering theorem, while avoiding Russell's paradox. Zermelo's system would later be extended by Abraham Fraenkel and Thoralf Skolem in the 1920s to create the standard foundation of set theory, called Zermelo–Fraenkel set theory (ZFC, "C" for the Axiom of Choice), the current foundation of modern mathematics. This system had an iterative approach, for example, asserting that if a given set X exists, then a set Y with specific properties also exists, excluding definitions like "the set of all objects such that..." as primitives. As a theorem, it proved that Cantor's absolute infinite collections causing the paradoxes did not exist (more specifically, that they were not sets).

A guiding heuristic at the time to determine what kinds of axioms were admissible was limitation of size, which claimed that the cause of set theoretic paradoxes were set theories allowing collections "too large" to be "sets", and disallowing axioms—such as unrestricted comprehension—that allowed the creation of these sets. Taking inspiration from Zermelo's 1908 axiom system, in 1923, John von Neumann introduced a new system of axioms which was capable of including these "too big" sets as part of the theory, though separated them ontologically. He disallowed these "too big" collections to be elements of other collections. He later distinguished them as "sets" [Mengen] and "domains" [Bereiche]; the latter now commonly called "classes", resolving issues of self-reference caused by, for example, allowing the collection of all sets to be a set, or the collection of all ordinal numbers to be an ordinal. Von Neumann's intuition of sets was heavily influenced by the limitation of size doctrine of the time, which he incorporated in to his system as the axiom of limitation of size (LoS): that a domain (class or collection) was "too big" if and only if it was equinumerous to the whole domain of all sets. By his own admission, this was a very effective axiom, implying many of Zermelo's original axiom, which he saw as a good reason to be suspicious of the axiom. So in 1928, he published a paper proving the axiom from a simpler system of axioms. This system was later refined by Paul Bernays and Kurt Gödel between the 1930s to 1950s to create the system now called von Neumann–Bernays–Gödel set theory (NBG). This system was shown to be a conservative extension of ZFC, meaning any statement about sets that could be proven in NBG could also be proven in ZFC, and the implementation of classes in NBG is generally considered to capture Cantor's original notion of the absolute infinite.

== Cantor's view ==
Cantor said:

The actual infinite was distinguished by three relations: first, as it is realized in the supreme perfection, in the completely independent, extra worldly existence, in Deo, where I call it absolute infinite or simply absolute; second to the extent that it is represented in the dependent, creatural world; third as it can be conceived in abstracto in thought as a mathematical magnitude, number or order type. In the latter two relations, where it obviously reveals itself as limited and capable for further proliferation and hence familiar to the finite, I call it Transfinitum and strongly contrast it with the absolute.

While using the Latin expression in Deo (in God), Cantor identifies absolute infinity with God (GA 175–176, 376, 378, 386, 399). According to Cantor, Absolute Infinity is beyond mathematical comprehension and shall be interpreted in terms of negative theology.

Cantor also mentioned the idea in his letters to Richard Dedekind (text in square brackets not present in original): (Note: Gesammelte Abhandlungen, Georg Cantor, ed. Ernst Zermelo, Hildesheim: Georg Olms Verlagsbuchhandlung, 1962, pp. 443–447; translated into English in From Frege to Gödel: A Source Book in Mathematical Logic, 1879-1931, ed. Jean van Heijenoort, Cambridge, Massachusetts: Harvard University Press, 1967, pp. 113–117. These references both purport to be a letter from Cantor to Dedekind, dated July 28, 1899. However, as Ivor Grattan-Guinness has discovered, this is in fact an amalgamation by Cantor's editor, Ernst Zermelo, of two letters from Cantor to Dedekind, the first dated July 28 and the second dated August 3.)

A multiplicity [he appears to mean what we now call a set] is called well-ordered if it fulfills the condition that every sub-multiplicity has a first element; such a multiplicity I call for short a "sequence".
...
Now I envisage the system of all [ordinal] numbers and denote it Ω.
...
The system Ω in its natural ordering according to magnitude is a "sequence".
Now let us adjoin 0 as an additional element to this sequence, and place it, obviously, in the first position; then we obtain a sequence Ω′:
0, 1, 2, 3, ... ω_{0}, ω_{0}+1, ..., γ, ...
of which one can readily convince oneself that every number γ occurring in it is the type [i.e., order-type] of the sequence of all its preceding elements (including 0). (The sequence Ω has this property first for ω_{0}+1. [ω_{0}+1 should be ω_{0}.])

Now Ω′ (and therefore also Ω) cannot be a consistent multiplicity. For if Ω′ were consistent, then as a well-ordered set, a number δ would correspond to it which would be greater than all numbers of the system Ω; the number δ, however, also belongs to the system Ω, because it comprises all numbers. Thus δ would be greater than δ, which is a contradiction. Therefore:

The system Ω of all [ordinal] numbers is an inconsistent, absolutely infinite multiplicity.

== The Burali-Forti paradox ==
The idea that the collection of all ordinal numbers cannot logically exist seems paradoxical to many. This is related to the Burali-Forti's paradox which implies that there can be no greatest ordinal number. All of these problems can be traced back to the idea that, for every property that can be logically defined, there exists a set of all objects that have that property. However, as in Cantor's argument (above), this idea leads to difficulties.

More generally, as noted by A. W. Moore, there can be no end to the process of set formation, and thus no such thing as the totality of all sets, or the set hierarchy. Any such totality would itself have to be a set, thus lying somewhere within the hierarchy and thus failing to contain every set.

A standard solution to this problem is found in Zermelo set theory, which does not allow the unrestricted formation of sets from arbitrary properties. Rather, we may form the set of all objects that have a given property and lie in some given set (Zermelo's axiom of separation). This allows for the formation of sets based on properties, in a limited sense, while (hopefully) preserving the consistency of the theory.

While this solves the logical problem, one could argue that the philosophical problem remains. It seems natural that a set of individuals ought to exist, so long as the individuals exist. Indeed, naive set theory might be said to be based on this notion. Although Zermelo's fix allows a class to describe arbitrary (possibly "large") entities, these predicates of the metalanguage may have no formal existence (i.e., as a set) within the theory. For example, the class of all sets would be a proper class. This is philosophically unsatisfying to some and has motivated additional work in set theory and other methods of formalizing the foundations of mathematics such as New Foundations by Willard Van Orman Quine.

== See also ==
- Absolute (philosophy)
- Actual infinity
- Ineffability
- Limitation of size
- Monadology

== Bibliography ==
- The role of the absolute infinite in Cantor's conception of set
- Infinity and the Mind, Rudy Rucker, Princeton, New Jersey: Princeton University Press, 1995, ISBN 0-691-00172-3; orig. pub. Boston: Birkhäuser, 1982, ISBN 3-7643-3034-1.
- The Infinite, A. W. Moore, London, New York: Routledge, 1990, ISBN 0-415-03307-1.
- Set Theory, Skolem's Paradox and the Tractatus, A. W. Moore, Analysis 45, #1 (January 1985), pp. 13–20.
