= General set theory =

System of mathematical set theory

General set theory (GST) is George Boolos's (1998) name for a fragment of the axiomatic set theory Z. GST is sufficient for all mathematics not requiring infinite sets, and is the weakest known set theory whose theorems include the first-order Peano axioms.

== Ontology ==
The ontology of GST is identical to that of ZFC, and hence is thoroughly canonical. GST features a single primitive ontological notion, that of set, and a single ontological assumption, namely that all individuals in the universe of discourse (hence all mathematical objects) are sets. There is a single primitive binary relation, set membership; that set a is a member of set b is written a ∈ b (usually read "a is an element of b").

== Axioms ==
The symbolic axioms below are from Boolos (1998: 196), and govern how sets behave and interact. As with Z, the background logic for GST is first-order logic with identity. Indeed, GST is the fragment of Z obtained by omitting the axioms Union, Power Set, Elementary Sets (essentially Pairing) and Infinity and then taking a theorem of Z, Adjunction, as an axiom. The natural language versions of the axioms are intended to aid the intuition.

1) Axiom of Extensionality: The sets x and y are the same set if they have the same members.

$$\forall x \forall y [\forall z [z \in x \leftrightarrow z \in y] \rightarrow x = y].$$

The converse of this axiom follows from the substitution property of equality.

2) Axiom Schema of Specification (or Separation or Restricted Comprehension): If z is a set and $\phi$ is any property that may be satisfied by all, some, or no elements of z, then there exists a subset y of z containing just those elements x in z that satisfy the property $\phi$. The restriction to z is necessary to avoid Russell's paradox and its variants. More formally, let $\phi(x)$ be any formula in the language of GST in which x may occur freely and y does not. Then all instances of the following schema are axioms:

$$\forall z \exists y \forall x [x \in y \leftrightarrow ( x \in z \land \phi(x))].$$

3) Axiom of Adjunction: If x and y are sets, then there exists a set w, the adjunction of x and y, whose members are just y and the members of x.

$$\forall x \forall y \exist w \forall z [ z \in w \leftrightarrow (z \in x \lor z=y)].$$

Adjunction refers to an elementary operation on two sets, and has no bearing on the use of that term elsewhere in mathematics, including in category theory.

ST is GST with the axiom schema of specification replaced by the axiom of empty set:

$$\exists x \forall y [y \notin x].$$

== Discussion ==
=== Metamathematics ===
Note that Specification is an axiom schema. The theory given by these axioms is not finitely axiomatizable. Montague (1961) showed that ZFC is not finitely axiomatizable, and his argument carries over to GST. Hence any axiomatization of GST must include at least one axiom schema. With its simple axioms, GST is also immune to the three great antinomies of naïve set theory: Russell's, Burali-Forti's, and Cantor's.

GST is interpretable in relation algebra because no part of any GST axiom lies in the scope of more than three quantifiers. This is the necessary and sufficient condition given in Tarski and Givant (1987).

=== Peano arithmetic ===
Setting φ(x) in Separation to x≠x, and assuming that the domain is nonempty, assures the existence of the empty set. Adjunction implies that if x is a set, then so is $S(x) = x \cup \{x\}$. Given Adjunction, the usual construction of the successor ordinals from the empty set can proceed, one in which the natural numbers are defined as $\varnothing,\,S(\varnothing),\,S(S(\varnothing)),\,\ldots$ (see Set-theoretic definition of natural numbers). GST is mutually interpretable with Peano arithmetic (thus it has the same proof-theoretic strength as PA).

The most remarkable fact about ST (and hence GST), is that these tiny fragments of set theory give rise to such rich metamathematics. While ST is a small fragment of the well-known canonical set theories ZFC and NBG, ST interprets Robinson arithmetic (Q), so that ST inherits the nontrivial metamathematics of Q. For example, ST is essentially undecidable because Q is, and every consistent theory whose theorems include the ST axioms is also essentially undecidable. This includes GST and every axiomatic set theory worth thinking about, assuming these are consistent. In fact, the undecidability of ST implies the undecidability of first-order logic with a single binary predicate letter.

Q is also incomplete in the sense of Gödel's incompleteness theorem. Any axiomatizable theory, such as ST and GST, whose theorems include the Q axioms is likewise incomplete. Moreover, the consistency of GST cannot be proved within GST itself, unless GST is in fact inconsistent.

=== Infinite sets ===
Given any model M of ZFC, the collection of hereditarily finite sets in M will satisfy the GST axioms. Therefore, GST cannot prove the existence of even a countable infinite set, that is, of a set whose cardinality is $\aleph_0$. Even if GST did afford a countably infinite set, GST could not prove the existence of a set whose cardinality is $\aleph_1$, because GST lacks the axiom of power set. Hence GST cannot ground analysis and geometry, and is too weak to serve as a foundation for mathematics.

== History ==
Boolos was interested in GST only as a fragment of Z that is just powerful enough to interpret Peano arithmetic. He never lingered over GST, only mentioning it briefly in several papers discussing the systems of Frege's Grundlagen and Grundgesetze, and how they could be modified to eliminate Russell's paradox. The system Aξ'[δ_{0}] in Tarski and Givant (1987: 223) is essentially GST with an axiom schema of induction replacing Specification, and with the existence of an empty set explicitly assumed.

GST is called STZ in Burgess (2005), p. 223. Burgess's theory ST is GST with Empty Set replacing the axiom schema of specification. That the letters "ST" also appear in "GST" is a coincidence.
