= Limitation of size =

Notion in philosophy of mathematics

In the philosophy of mathematics, specifically the philosophical foundations of set theory, limitation of size is a concept developed by Philip Jourdain and/or Georg Cantor to avoid Cantor's paradox. It identifies certain "inconsistent multiplicities", in Cantor's terminology, that cannot be sets because they are "too large". In modern terminology these are called proper classes.

== Use ==
The axiom of limitation of size is an axiom in some versions of von Neumann–Bernays–Gödel set theory or Morse–Kelley set theory. This axiom says that any class that is not "too large" is a set, and a set cannot be "too large". "Too large" is defined as being large enough that the class of all sets can be mapped one-to-one into it.
