= John Lane Bell =

Canadian philosopher and logician

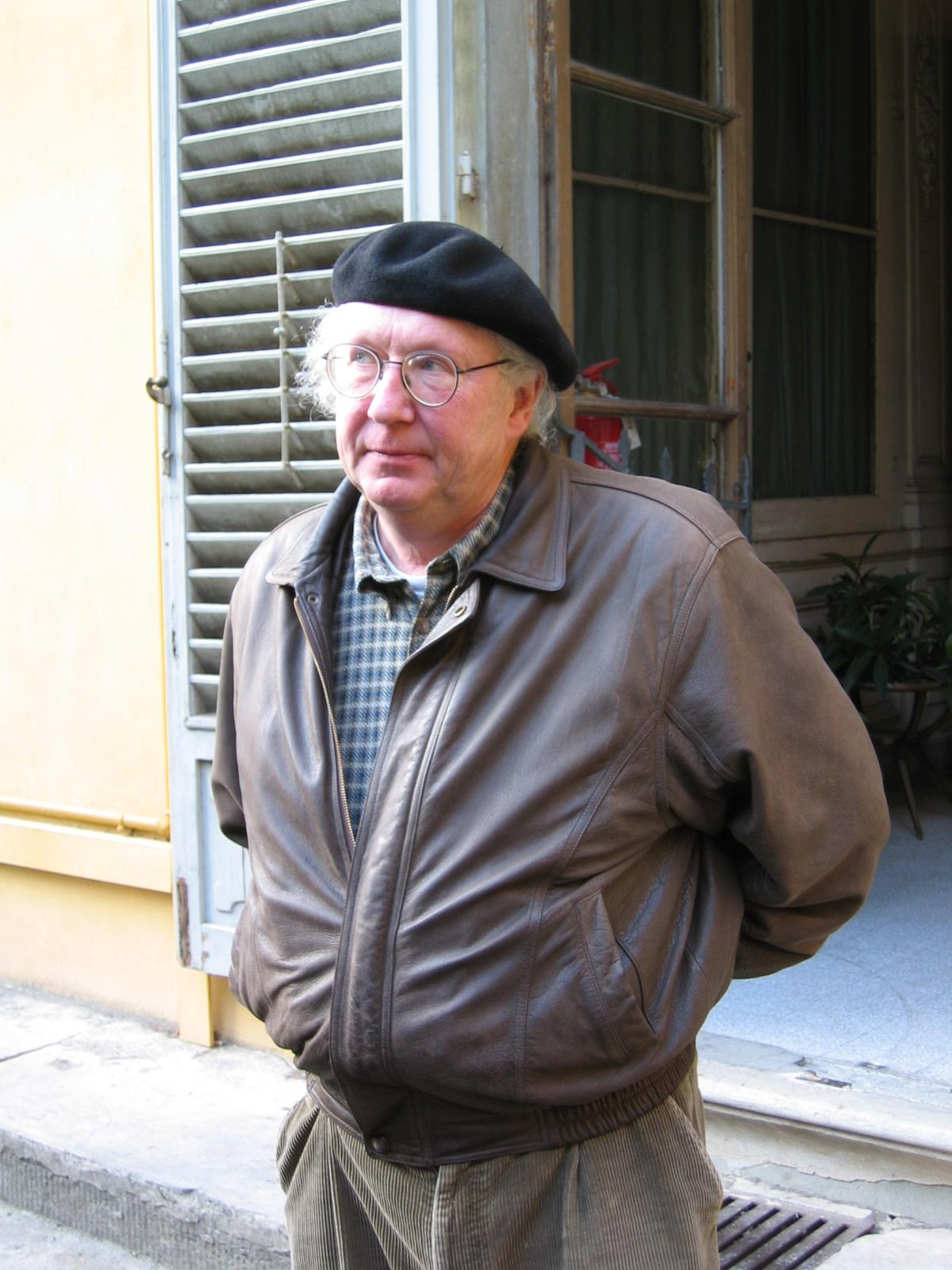
- Born: March 25, 1945 (age 81)
- Education: Oxford University
- Scientific career
- Fields: set theory, model theory, lattice theory, modal logic, quantum logic, constructive mathematics, type theory, topos theory, infinitesimal analysis, philosophy of mathematics
- Workplaces: University of Western Ontario
- Doctoral advisor: John Newsome Crossley
- Doctoral students: Graham Priest

John Lane Bell FRSC (born March 25, 1945) is a Canadian philosopher, mathematician, and logician specializing in mathematical logic and the foundations of mathematics. He served as Professor of Philosophy at the University of Western Ontario from 1989 until his retirement in 2019, and previously held positions at the London School of Economics from 1968 to 1989. Elected a Fellow of the Royal Society of Canada in 2009, Bell's research encompasses constructive mathematics, intuitionistic logic, set theory, topos theory, and the axiom of choice, among other topics.

Bell has authored influential books including Intuitionistic Set Theory (2014), which explores set-theoretic foundations intuitionistic principles, and Oppositions and Paradoxes (2016), addressing logical and philosophical paradoxes. His work bridges technical developments in logic with philosophical inquiries into continuity, infinitesimals, and the nature of mathematical structures, contributing to the ongoing debates in the philosophy of mathematics.

== Biography ==
John Bell was awarded a scholarship to Oxford University at the age of 15, and graduated with a D.Phil. in Mathematics: his dissertation supervisor was John Crossley. During 1968–89 he was Lecturer in Mathematics and Reader in Mathematical Logic at the London School of Economics.

Bell's students include Graham Priest (Ph.D. Mathematics LSE, 1972), Michael Hallett (Ph.D. Philosophy LSE, 1979), David DeVidi (Ph.D. Philosophy UWO, 1994), Elaine Landry (Ph.D. Philosophy UWO, 1997) and Richard A. Feist (Ph.D. Philosophy UWO, 1999).

== Bibliography ==
- The Continuous, the Discrete, and the Infinitesimal in Philosophy and Mathematics (New and Revised Edition of 2005 book), Springer, 2019.
- Oppositions and Paradoxes: Philosophical Perplexities in Science and Mathematics. Broadview Press, 2016.
- Intuitionistic Set Theory. College Publications, 2013.
- Set Theory: Boolean-Valued Models and Independence Proofs. Oxford University Press 2011.
- The Axiom of Choice. College Publications, 2009.
- The Continuous and the Infinitesimal in Mathematics and Philosophy. Polimetrica, 2005.
- (With D. DeVidi and G. Solomon) Logical Options: An Introduction to Classical and Alternative Logics. Broadview Press, 2001.
- The Art of the Intelligible: An Elementary Survey of Mathematics in its Conceptual Development. Kluwer, 1999.
- A Primer of Infinitesimal Analysis. Cambridge University Press, 1998. Second Edition, 2008.
- Toposes & Local Set Theories: An Introduction. Clarendon Press, Oxford, 1988. Reprinted by Dover, 2008.
- Boolean-Valued Models and Independence Proofs in Set Theory. Clarendon Press, Oxford, 1977. 2nd edition, 1985. 3rd edition, 2005.
- (With M. Machover). A Course in Mathematical Logic. North-Holland, Amsterdam, 1977. 4th printing, 2003.
- (With A. B. Slomson). Models and Ultraproducts: An Introduction. North-Holland, Amsterdam, 1969. Reprinted by Dover, 2006.
