= Axiom of pairing =

Concept in axiomatic set theory

In axiomatic set theory and the branches of logic, mathematics, and computer science that use it, the axiom of pairing is one of the axioms of Zermelo–Fraenkel set theory. It was introduced by Zermelo (1908) as a special case of his axiom of elementary sets.

== Formal statement ==
In the formal language of the Zermelo–Fraenkel axioms, the axiom reads:

$$\forall A \, \forall B \, \exists C \, \forall D \, [D \in C \iff (D = A \lor D = B)]$$

In words:

Given any object A and any object B, there is a set C such that, given any object D, D is a member of C if and only if D is equal to A or D is equal to B.

== Consequences ==
As noted, what the axiom is saying is that, given two objects A and B, we can find a set C whose members are exactly A and B.

We can use the axiom of extensionality to show that this set C is unique. We call the set C the pair of A and B, and denote it {A,B}. Thus the essence of the axiom is:

Any two objects have a pair.

The set {A,A} is abbreviated {A}, called the singleton containing A. Note that a singleton is a special case of a pair. Being able to construct a singleton is necessary, for example, to show the non-existence of the infinitely descending chains $x=\{x\}$ from the axiom of regularity.

The axiom of pairing also allows for the definition of ordered pairs. For any objects $a$ and $b$, the ordered pair is defined by the following:

$$(a, b) = \{ \{ a \}, \{ a, b \} \}.\,$$

Note that this definition satisfies the condition

$$(a, b) = (c, d) \iff a = c \land b = d.$$

Ordered n-tuples can be defined recursively as follows:

$$(a_1, \ldots, a_n) = ((a_1, \ldots, a_{n-1}), a_n).\!$$

== Alternatives ==
=== Non-independence ===
The axiom of pairing is generally considered uncontroversial, and it or an equivalent appears in just about any axiomatization of set theory. Nevertheless, in the standard formulation of the Zermelo–Fraenkel set theory, the axiom of pairing follows from the axiom schema of replacement applied to any given set with two or more elements, and thus it is sometimes omitted. The existence of such a set with two elements, such as { {}, { {} } }, can be deduced either from the axiom of empty set and the axiom of power set or from the axiom of infinity.

In the absence of some of the stronger ZFC axioms, the axiom of pairing can still, without loss, be introduced in weaker forms.

=== Weaker ===
In the presence of standard forms of the axiom schema of separation we can replace the axiom of pairing by its weaker version:

$$\forall A\forall B\exists C\forall D((D=A\lor D=B)\Rightarrow D\in C)$$.

This weak axiom of pairing implies that any given objects $A$ and $B$ are members of some set $C$. Using the axiom schema of separation we can construct the set whose members are exactly $A$ and $B$.

Another axiom which implies the axiom of pairing in the presence of the axiom of empty set is the axiom of adjunction

$$\forall A \, \forall B \, \exists C \, \forall D \, [D \in C \iff (D \in A \lor D = B)]$$.

It differs from the standard one by use of $D \in A$ instead of $D=A$. Using {} for A and x for B, we get {x} for C. Then use {x} for A and y for B, getting {x,y} for C. One may continue in this fashion to build up any finite set. And this could be used to generate all hereditarily finite sets without using the axiom of union.

=== Stronger ===
Together with the axiom of empty set and the axiom of union, the axiom of pairing can be generalised to the following schema:

$$\forall A_1 \, \ldots \, \forall A_n \, \exists C \, \forall D \, [D \in C \iff (D = A_1 \lor \cdots \lor D = A_n)]$$

that is:

Given any finite number of objects A_{1} through A_{n}, there is a set C whose members are precisely A_{1} through A_{n}.

This set C is again unique by the axiom of extensionality, and is denoted {A_{1},...,A_{n}}.

Of course, we can't refer to a finite number of objects rigorously without already having in our hands a (finite) set to which the objects in question belong. Thus, this is not a single statement but instead a schema, with a separate statement for each natural number n.

- The case n = 1 is the axiom of pairing with A = A_{1} and B = A_{1}.
- The case n = 2 is the axiom of pairing with A = A_{1} and B = A_{2}.
- The cases n > 2 can be proved using the axiom of pairing and the axiom of union multiple times.

For example, to prove the case n = 3, use the axiom of pairing three times, to produce the pair {A_{1},A_{2}}, the singleton {A_{3}}, and then the pair {{A_{1},A_{2}},{A_{3}}}. The axiom of union then produces the desired result, {A_{1},A_{2},A_{3}}. We can extend this schema to include n=0 if we interpret that case as the axiom of empty set.

Thus, one may use this as an axiom schema in the place of the axioms of empty set and pairing. Normally, however, one uses the axioms of empty set and pairing separately, and then proves this as a theorem schema. Note that adopting this as an axiom schema will not replace the axiom of union, which is still needed for other situations.
