= Union (set theory) =

Set of elements in any of some sets

Union of two sets: $~A \cup B$

Union of three sets: $~A \cup B \cup C$

The union of A, B, C, D, and E is everything except the white area.

In set theory, the union (denoted by ∪) of a collection of sets is the set of all elements in the collection. It is one of the fundamental operations through which sets can be combined and related to each other. A nullary union refers to a union of zero ($0$) sets and it is by definition equal to the empty set.

For explanation of the symbols used in this article, refer to the table of mathematical symbols.

== Union of two sets ==
The union of two sets A and B is the set of elements which are in A, in B, or in both A and B. In set-builder notation,

$A \cup B = \{ x: x \in A \text{ or } x \in B\}$.

For example, if A = {1, 3, 5, 7} and B = {1, 2, 4, 6, 7} then A ∪ B = {1, 2, 3, 4, 5, 6, 7}. A more elaborate example (involving two infinite sets) is:

A = {x is an even integer greater than 1}
B = {x is an odd integer greater than 1}
$$A \cup B = \{2,3,4,5,6, \dots\}$$

As another example, the number 9 is not contained in the union of the set of prime numbers {2, 3, 5, 7, 11, ...} and the set of even numbers {2, 4, 6, 8, 10, ...}, because 9 is neither prime nor even.

Sets cannot have duplicate elements, so the union of the sets {1, 2, 3} and {2, 3, 4} is {1, 2, 3, 4}.

=== Finite unions ===
One can take the union of several sets simultaneously. For example, the union of three sets A, B, and C contains all elements of A, all elements of B, and all elements of C, and nothing else. Thus, x is an element of A ∪ B ∪ C if and only if x is in at least one of A, B, and C.

A finite union is the union of a finite number of sets; the phrase does not imply that the union set is a finite set.

== Notation ==
The notation for the general concept can vary considerably. For a finite union of sets $S_1, S_2, S_3, \dots , S_n$ one often writes $S_1 \cup S_2 \cup S_3 \cup \dots \cup S_n$ or $\bigcup_{i=1}^n S_i$. Various common notations for arbitrary unions include $\bigcup \mathbf{M}$, $\bigcup_{A\in\mathbf{M}} A$, and $\bigcup_{i\in I} A_{i}$. The last of these notations refers to the union of the collection $\left\{A_i : i \in I\right\}$, where I is an index set and $A_i$ is a set for every $i \in I$. In the case that the index set I is the set of natural numbers, one uses the notation $\bigcup_{i=1}^{\infty} A_{i}$, which is analogous to that of the infinite sums in series.

When the symbol "∪" is placed before other symbols (instead of between them), it is usually rendered as a larger size.

=== Notation encoding ===
In Unicode, union is represented by the character U+222A ∪ UNION. In TeX, $\cup$ is rendered from \cup and $\bigcup$ is rendered from \bigcup; In Typst, union renders $\cup$, where union.big renders $\bigcup$.

== Arbitrary union ==
The most general notion is the union of an arbitrary collection of sets, sometimes called an infinitary union. If M is a set or class whose elements are sets, then x is an element of the union of M if and only if there is at least one element A of M such that x is an element of A. In symbols:

$$x \in \bigcup \mathbf{M} \iff \exists A \in \mathbf{M},\ x \in A.$$

This idea subsumes the preceding sections—for example, A ∪ B ∪ C is the union of the collection {A, B, C}. Also, if M is the empty collection, then the union of M is the empty set.

=== Formal derivation ===
In Zermelo–Fraenkel set theory (ZFC) and other set theories, the ability to take the arbitrary union of any sets is granted by the axiom of union, which states that, given any set of sets $A$, there exists a set $B$, whose elements are exactly those of the elements of $A$. Sometimes this axiom is less specific, where there exists a $B$ which contains the elements of the elements of $A$, but may be larger. For example if $A = \{ \{1\}, \{2\} \},$ then it may be that $B = \{ 1, 2, 3\}$ since $B$ contains 1 and 2. This can be fixed by using the axiom of specification to get the subset of $B$ whose elements are exactly those of the elements of $A$. Then one can use the axiom of extensionality to show that this set is unique. For readability, define the binary predicate $\operatorname{Union}(X,Y)$ meaning "$X$ is the union of $Y$" or "$X = \bigcup Y$" as:

$$\operatorname{Union}(X,Y) \iff \forall x (x \in X \iff \exists y \in Y ( x \in y))$$

Then, one can prove the statement "for all $Y$, there is a unique $X$, such that $X$ is the union of $Y$":

$$\forall Y \, \exists ! X (\operatorname{Union}(X,Y))$$

Then, one can use an extension by definition to add the union operator $\bigcup A$ to the language of ZFC as:

$$\begin{align}
B = \bigcup A   & \iff \operatorname{Union}(B,A) \\
& \iff \forall x (x \in B \iff \exists y \in Y(x \in y))
\end{align}$$

or equivalently:

$$x \in \bigcup A \iff \exists y \in A \, (x \in y)$$

After the union operator has been defined, the binary union $A \cup B$ can be defined by showing there exists a unique set $C = \{A,B\}$ using the axiom of pairing, and defining $A \cup B = \bigcup \{A,B\}$. Then, finite unions can be defined inductively as:

$$\bigcup _ {i=1} ^ 0 A_i = \varnothing \text{, and } \bigcup_{i=1}^n A_i = \left(\bigcup_{i=1}^{n-1} A_i \right) \cup A_n$$

== Algebraic properties ==
Binary union is an associative operation; that is, for any sets $A, B, \text{ and } C$,
$$A \cup (B \cup C) = (A \cup B) \cup C.$$
Thus, the parentheses may be omitted without ambiguity: either of the above can be written as $A \cup B \cup C$. Also, union is commutative, so the sets can be written in any order. The empty set is an identity element for the operation of union. That is, $A \cup \varnothing = A$, for any set $A$. Also, the union operation is idempotent: $A \cup A = A$. All these properties follow from analogous facts about logical disjunction.

Intersection distributes over union
$$A \cap (B \cup C) = (A \cap B)\cup(A \cap C)$$
and union distributes over intersection
$$A \cup (B \cap C) = (A \cup B) \cap (A \cup C).$$
The power set of a set $U$, together with the operations given by union, intersection, and complementation, is a Boolean algebra. In this Boolean algebra, union can be expressed in terms of intersection and complementation by the formula
$$A \cup B = ( A^\complement \cap B^\complement )^\complement,$$
where the superscript ${}^\complement$ denotes the complement in the universal set $U$. Alternatively, intersection can be expressed in terms of union and complementation in a similar way: $A \cap B = ( A^\complement \cup B^\complement )^\complement$. These two expressions together are called De Morgan's laws.

== History and etymology ==
The english word union comes from the term in middle French meaning "coming together", which comes from the post-classical Latin unionem, "oneness". The original term for union in set theory was Vereinigung (in german), which was introduced in 1895 by Georg Cantor. The english use of union of two sets in mathematics began to be used by at least 1912, used by James Pierpont. The symbol $\cup$ used for union in mathematics was introduced by Giuseppe Peano in his Arithmetices principia in 1889, along with the notations for intersection $\cap$, set membership $\in$, and subsets $\subset$.

== See also ==
- Algebra of sets – Identities and relationships involving sets
- Alternation (formal language theory) − the union of sets of strings
- Axiom of union – Concept in axiomatic set theory
- Disjoint union – In mathematics, operation on sets
- Inclusion–exclusion principle – Counting technique in combinatorics
- Intersection (set theory) – Set of elements common to all of some sets
- Iterated binary operation – Repeated application of an operation to a sequence
- List of set identities and relations – Equalities for combinations of sets
- Naive set theory – Informal set theories
- Symmetric difference – Elements in exactly one of two sets
