= Axiom of global choice =

Axiom in set theory

In mathematics, specifically in class theories, the axiom of global choice is a stronger variant of the axiom of choice that applies to proper classes of sets as well as sets of sets. Informally it states that one can simultaneously choose an element from every non-empty set.

== Statement ==
The axiom of global choice states that there is a global choice function τ, meaning a function such that for every non-empty set z, τ(z) is an element of z.

The axiom of global choice cannot be stated directly in the language of Zermelo–Fraenkel set theory (ZF) with the axiom of choice (AC), known as ZFC, as the choice function τ is a proper class and in ZFC one cannot quantify over classes. It can be stated by adding a new function symbol τ to the language of ZFC, with the property that τ is a global choice function. This is a conservative extension of ZFC: every provable statement of this extended theory that can be stated in the language of ZFC is already provable in ZFC (Fraenkel, Bar-Hillel & Levy 1973, p.72). Alternatively, Gödel showed that given the axiom of constructibility one can write down an explicit (though somewhat complicated) choice function τ in the language of ZFC, so in some sense the axiom of constructibility implies global choice (in fact, [ZFC proves that] in the language extended by the unary function symbol τ, the axiom of constructibility implies that if τ is said explicitly definable function, then this τ is a global choice function. And then global choice morally holds, with τ as a witness).

In the language of von Neumann–Bernays–Gödel set theory (NBG) and Morse–Kelley set theory, the axiom of global choice can be stated directly (Fraenkel, Bar-Hillel & Levy 1973, p.133), and is equivalent to various other statements:

- Every class of nonempty sets has a choice function.
- V \ {∅} has a choice function (where V is the class of all sets).
- There is a well-ordering of V.
- There is a bijection between V and the class of all ordinal numbers.

In von Neumann–Bernays–Gödel set theory, global choice does not add any consequence about sets (not proper classes) beyond what could have been deduced from the ordinary axiom of choice.

Global choice is a consequence of the axiom of limitation of size.
