= Michael Hallett =

British philosopher

Education
- Education: London School of Economics (BA, PhD)

Philosophical work
- Era: 21st-century philosophy
- Region: Western philosophy
- Institutions: McGill University

Michael Frank Hallett is a British philosopher and John Frothingham Professor of Logic and Metaphysics at McGill University. He is known for his works on set theory.

== Books ==
- Hallett, Michael (1984), Cantorian Set Theory and Limitation of Size, Oxford: Clarendon Press, ISBN 0-19-853179-6.
