= Axiom of union =

Concept in axiomatic set theory

In axiomatic set theory, the axiom of union is one of the axioms of Zermelo–Fraenkel set theory. This axiom was introduced by Ernst Zermelo.

Informally, the axiom states that if $X$ is a set of sets, then the union of all sets in $X$ is still a set. In more basic terms, for each set $X$ there is a set $Y$ whose elements are precisely the elements of the elements of $X$.

== Formal statement ==
In the formal language of the Zermelo–Fraenkel axioms, the axiom reads:
$$\forall X\, \exists Y\, \forall u\, (u \in Y \leftrightarrow \exists z\, (u \in z \land z \in X))$$
or in words:

Given any set X, there is a set Y such that, for any element u, u is a member of Y if and only if there is a set z such that u is a member of z and z is a member of X.

or, more simply:

For any set $X$, there is a set $\bigcup X$ which consists of just the elements of the elements of that set $X$.

== Consequences ==
The axiom of union allows one to unpack a set of sets and thus create a flatter set. Together with the axiom of pairing, it implies that for any two sets $A$ and $B$, their binary union $A \cup B$ is also a set.

Together with the axiom schema of replacement, the axiom of union implies that one can form the union of a family of sets indexed by a set.

The axiom of union is often used to construct the limit of an infinite sequence of sets $X_0 \subseteq X_1 \subseteq X_2 \subseteq \cdots$. For example, it can be used to construct the supremum of any set of ordinal numbers.

== Weaker form ==
In the context of set theories which include the axiom schema of separation, the axiom of union is sometimes stated in a weaker form which only produces a superset of the union of a set. For example, Kunen states the axiom as
$$\forall \mathcal{F} \,\exists A \, \forall Y\, \forall x [(x \in Y \land Y \in \mathcal{F}) \Rightarrow x \in A]$$
to facilitate its verification in various models. This form is logically equivalent to
$$\forall \mathcal{F} \,\exists A \forall x [ [\exists Y (x \in Y \land Y \in \mathcal{F}) ] \Rightarrow x \in A].$$
Compared to the axiom stated at the top of this section, this variation asserts only one direction of the implication, rather than both directions.

== Independence ==
In its full generality, the axiom of union is independent from the rest of the ZFC-axioms. It is the only axiom that asserts the existence of singular strong limit cardinals such as $\beth_\omega$ (beth-omega, the limit of the sequence $\aleph_0, 2^{\aleph_0}, 2^{2^{\aleph_0} }, \ldots$). Concretely, if $\kappa$ is a singular strong limit cardinal, then the set of sets $X$ such that $\vert X \vert < \kappa$ and $\vert y \vert < \kappa$ for all $y$ in the transitive closure of $X$ (Note: This condition is known as $X$ being pseudo-hereditarily of cardinality less than $\kappa$, to distinguish it from the stronger condition of being hereditarily of cardinality less than $\kappa$, which requires the transitive closure itself to have cardinality less than $\kappa$.) forms a model of $\text{ZFC} - \text{Union}$ (the ZFC axioms minus the axiom of union).

However, many results in ZF(C) remain valid even without the axiom of union. The axiom schema of replacement allows one to form a union if one can construct a set of the same or larger cardinality, together with a definable surjection from it onto that union, which can often be achieved with the axiom of power set. For example, the binary union $A \cup B$ can be constructed when the cardinalities $\vert A \vert$ and $\vert B \vert$ are comparable, since without loss of generality one can assume that $\vert A \vert \le \vert B \vert$ and $2 \le \vert B \vert$, and then
$$|A \cup B| \le |A| + |B| \le 2 \cdot |B| \le |B| \cdot |B| = |B \times B| \le |\mathcal{P}(\mathcal{P}(B))|$$
where the final inequality follows from the definition of the Cartesian product using the Kuratowski ordered pair.

Assuming the axiom of choice, the well-ordering theorem can be proved without the axiom of union, which can be used to show that $\bigcup X$ exists as long as the cardinalities of all sets in $X$ are bounded. This condition is always true for finite unions, or more generally when $X$ only contains sets with a finite number of infinite cardinalities. Conversely, assuming the consistency of ZF, there exists a model of $\text{ZFC} - \text{Union}$ such that $\bigcup X$ never exists when $X$ contains sets with an infinite number of infinite cardinalities.

== Relation to Intersection ==
There is no corresponding axiom of intersection. If $A$ is a nonempty set containing $E$, it is possible to form the intersection $\bigcap A$ using the axiom schema of specification as
$$\bigcap A = \{c\in E:\forall D(D\in A\Rightarrow c\in D)\},$$
so no separate axiom of intersection is necessary. (If A is the empty set, then trying to form the intersection of A as

{c: for all D in A, c is in D}

is not permitted by the axioms. Moreover, if such a set existed, then it would contain every set in the "universe", but the notion of a universal set is antithetical to Zermelo–Fraenkel set theory.)
