= Axiom of empty set =

Axiom of Set Theory

In axiomatic set theory, the axiom of empty set, also called the axiom of null set and the axiom of existence, is a statement that asserts the existence of a set with no elements. Although Zermelo originally stipulated the existence of a set with no elements as an axiom , it can be treated as either an axiom or a derivable truth depending on the specific set-theoretic context. It is an axiom of Kripke–Platek set theory and the variant of general set theory that Burgess (2005) calls "ST," and a demonstrable truth in Zermelo–Fraenkel set theory, with or without the axiom of choice.

== Formal statement ==
In the formal language of the Zermelo–Fraenkel axioms, the axiom reads:

$\exists A\, \forall x\, (x \notin A)$.

Or, alternatively, $\exists A\, \lnot \exists y\, (y \in A)$.

In words:

There is a set such that no element is a member of it.

== Interpretation ==
It follows from the axiom of extensionality that there is only one set with no elements. Since this set is unique, we can name it. It is called the empty set (denoted by { } or ∅). The axiom, stated in natural language, is:

An empty set exists.

This formula is a theorem, and considered true in every version of set theory. The only controversy is over how it should be justified: by making it an axiom; by deriving it from a set-existence axiom (or logic) and the axiom schema of separation; by deriving it from the axiom of infinity; or some other method.

In some formulations of ZF, the axiom of empty set is actually repeated in the axiom of infinity. However, there are other formulations of that axiom that do not presuppose the existence of an empty set. The ZF axioms can also be written using a constant symbol representing the empty set; then the axiom of infinity uses this symbol without requiring it to be empty, while the axiom of empty set is needed to state that it is in fact empty.

Furthermore, one sometimes considers set theories in which there are no infinite sets, and then the axiom of empty set may still be required. However, any axiom of set theory or logic that implies the existence of any set will imply the existence of the empty set, if one has the axiom schema of separation. This is true, since the empty set is that subset of any set consisting of those elements that satisfy a contradictory formula, for example $\varnothing = \{u \in w \mid u \neq u \}$.

In many formulations of first-order predicate logic, the existence of at least one object is always guaranteed. If the axiomatization of set theory is formulated in such a logical system with the axiom schema of separation as axioms, and if the theory makes no distinction between sets and other kinds of objects (which holds for ZF, KP, and similar theories), then the existence of the empty set is a theorem.

If separation is not postulated as an axiom schema but derived as a theorem schema from the schema of replacement (as is sometimes done), the situation is more complicated and depends on the exact formulation of the replacement schema. The formulation used in the axiom schema of replacement article only allows to construct the image F[a] when a is contained in the domain of the class function F; then the derivation of separation requires the axiom of empty set. On the other hand, the constraint of totality of F is often dropped from the replacement schema, in which case it implies the separation schema without using the axiom of empty set (or any other axiom for that matter).
