= Axiom of power set =

Concept in axiomatic set theory

The elements of the power set of the set {x, y, z} ordered with respect to inclusion.

In mathematics, the axiom of power set is one of the Zermelo–Fraenkel axioms of axiomatic set theory. It guarantees for every set $x$ the existence of a set $\mathcal{P}(x)$, the power set of $x$, consisting precisely of the subsets of $x$. By the axiom of extensionality, the set $\mathcal{P}(x)$ is unique.

The axiom of power set appears in most axiomatizations of set theory. It is generally considered uncontroversial, although constructive set theory prefers a weaker version to resolve concerns about predicativity.

== Formal statement ==
The subset relation $\subseteq$ is not a primitive notion in formal set theory and is not used in the formal language of the Zermelo–Fraenkel axioms. Rather, the subset relation $\subseteq$ is defined in terms of set membership, $\in$. Given this, in the formal language of the Zermelo–Fraenkel axioms, the axiom of power set reads:
$$\forall x \, \exists y \, \forall z \, [z \in y \iff \forall w \, (w \in z \Rightarrow w \in x)]$$
where y is the power set of x, z is any element of y, w is any member of z.

In English, this says:

Given any set x, there is a set y such that, given any set z, this set z is a member of y if and only if every element of z is also an element of x.

== Consequences ==
The power set axiom allows a simple definition of the Cartesian product of two sets $X$ and $Y$:

$$X \times Y = \{ (x, y) : x \in X \land y \in Y \}.$$

Notice that

$$x, y \in X \cup Y$$
$$\{ x \}, \{ x, y \} \in \mathcal{P}(X \cup Y)$$

and, for example, considering a model using the Kuratowski ordered pair,

$$(x, y) = \{ \{ x \}, \{ x, y \} \} \in \mathcal{P}(\mathcal{P}(X \cup Y))$$

and thus the Cartesian product is a set since

$$X \times Y \subseteq \mathcal{P}(\mathcal{P}(X \cup Y)).$$

One may define the Cartesian product of any finite collection of sets recursively:

$$X_1 \times \cdots \times X_n = (X_1 \times \cdots \times X_{n-1}) \times X_n.$$

The existence of the Cartesian product can be proved without using the power set axiom, as in the case of the Kripke–Platek set theory.

== Limitations ==
The power set axiom does not specify what subsets of a set exist, only that there is a set containing all those that do. Not all conceivable subsets are guaranteed to exist. In particular, the power set of an infinite set would contain only "constructible sets" if the universe is the constructible universe. But in other models of ZF, the universe could contain sets that are not constructible.
