= Scott–Potter set theory =

Approach to the foundations of mathematics

An approach to the foundations of mathematics that is of relatively recent origin, Scott–Potter set theory is a collection of nested axiomatic set theories set out by the philosopher Michael Potter, building on earlier work by the mathematician Dana Scott and the philosopher George Boolos.

Potter (1990, 2004) clarified and simplified the approach of Scott (1974), and showed how the resulting axiomatic set theory can do what is expected of such theory, namely grounding the cardinal and ordinal numbers, Peano arithmetic and the other usual number systems, and the theory of relations.

== ZU etc. ==
=== Preliminaries ===
This section and the next follow Part I of Potter (2004) closely. The background logic is first-order logic with identity. The ontology includes urelements as well as sets, which makes it clear that there can be sets of entities defined by first-order theories not based on sets. The urelements are not essential in that other mathematical structures can be defined as sets, and it is permissible for the set of urelements to be empty.

Some terminology peculiar to Potter's set theory:

- ι is a definite description operator and binds a variable. (In Potter's notation the iota symbol is inverted.)
- The predicate U holds for all urelements (non-collections).
- ιxΦ(x) exists iff (∃!x)Φ(x). (Potter uses Φ and other upper-case Greek letters to represent formulas.)
- {x : Φ(x)} is an abbreviation for ιy(not U(y) and (∀x)(x ∈ y ⇔ Φ(x))).
- a is a collection if {x : x∈a} exists. (All sets are collections, but not all collections are sets.)
- The accumulation of a, acc(a), is the set {x : x is an urelement or ∃b∈a (x∈b or x⊂b)}.
- If ∀v∈V(v = acc(V∩v)) then V is a history.
- A level is the accumulation of a history.
- An initial level has no other levels as members.
- A limit level is a level that is neither the initial level nor the level above any other level.
- A set is a subcollection of some level.
- The birthday of set a, denoted V(a), is the lowest level V such that a⊂V.

=== Axioms ===
The following three axioms define the theory ZU.

Creation: ∀V∃V' (V∈V' ).

Remark: There is no highest level, hence there are infinitely many levels. This axiom establishes the ontology of levels.

Separation: An axiom schema. For any first-order formula Φ(x) with (bound) variables ranging over the level V, the collection {x∈V : Φ(x)} is also a set. (See Axiom schema of separation.)

Remark: Given the levels established by Creation, this schema establishes the existence of sets and how to form them. It tells us that a level is a set, and all subsets, definable via first-order logic, of levels are also sets. This schema can be seen as an extension of the background logic.

Infinity: There exists at least one limit level. (See Axiom of infinity.)

Remark: Among the sets Separation allows, at least one is infinite. This axiom is primarily mathematical, as there is no need for the actual infinite in other human contexts, the human sensory order being necessarily finite. For mathematical purposes, the axiom "There exists an inductive set" would suffice.

=== Further existence premises ===
The following statements, while in the nature of axioms, are not axioms of ZU. Instead, they assert the existence of sets satisfying a stated condition. As such, they are "existence premises," meaning the following. Let X denote any statement below. Any theorem whose proof requires X is then formulated conditionally as "If X holds, then..." Potter defines several systems using existence premises, including the following two:

- ZfU =_{df} ZU + Ordinals;
- ZFU =_{df} Separation + Reflection.

Ordinals: For each (infinite) ordinal α, there exists a corresponding level V_{α}.

Remark: In words, "There exists a level corresponding to each infinite ordinal." Ordinals makes possible the conventional von Neumann definition of ordinal numbers.

Let τ(x) be a first-order term.

Replacement: An axiom schema. For any collection a, ∀x∈a[τ(x) is a set] → {τ(x) : x∈a} is a set.

Remark: If the term τ(x) is a function (call it f(x)), and if the domain of f is a set, then the range of f is also a set.

Reflection: Let Φ denote a first-order formula in which any number of free variables are present. Let Φ^{(V)} denote Φ with these free variables all quantified, with the quantified variables restricted to the level V.

Then ∃V[Φ→Φ^{(V)}] is an axiom.

Remark: This schema asserts the existence of a "partial" universe, namely the level V, in which all properties Φ holding when the quantified variables range over all levels, also hold when these variables range over V only. Reflection turns Creation, Infinity, Ordinals, and Replacement into theorems (Potter 2004: §13.3).

Let A and a denote sequences of nonempty sets, each indexed by n.

Countable Choice: Given any sequence A, there exists a sequence a such that:

∀n∈ω[a_{n}∈A_{n}].

Remark. Countable Choice enables proving that any set must be one of finite or infinite.

Let B and C denote sets, and let n index the members of B, each denoted B_{n}.

Choice: Let the members of B be disjoint nonempty sets. Then:

∃C∀n[C∩B_{n} is a singleton].

== Discussion ==
The von Neumann universe implements the "iterative conception of set" by stratifying the universe of sets into a series of "levels," with the sets at a given level being the members of the sets making up the next higher level. Hence the levels form a nested and well-ordered sequence, and would form a hierarchy if set membership were transitive. The resulting iterative conception steers clear, in a well-motivated way, of the well-known paradoxes of Russell, Burali-Forti, and Cantor. These paradoxes all result from the unrestricted use of the principle of comprehension that naive set theory allows. Collections such as "the class of all sets" or "the class of all ordinals" include sets from all levels of the hierarchy. Given the iterative conception, such collections cannot form sets at any given level of the hierarchy and thus cannot be sets at all. The iterative conception has gradually become more accepted over time, despite an imperfect understanding of its historical origins.

Boolos's (1989) axiomatic treatment of the iterative conception is his set theory S, a two sorted first-order theory involving sets and levels.

=== Scott's theory ===
Scott (1974) did not mention the "iterative conception of set," instead proposing his theory as a natural outgrowth of the simple theory of types. Nevertheless, Scott's theory can be seen as an axiomatization of the iterative conception and the associated iterative hierarchy.

Scott began with an axiom he declined to name: the atomic formula x∈y implies that y is a set. In symbols:

∀x,y∃a[x∈y→y=a].

His axiom of Extensionality and axiom schema of Comprehension (Separation) are strictly analogous to their ZF counterparts and so do not mention levels. He then invoked two axioms that do mention levels:

- Accumulation. A given level "accumulates" all members and subsets of all earlier levels. See the above definition of accumulation.
- Restriction. All collections belong to some level.

Restriction also implies the existence of at least one level and assures that all sets are well-founded.

Scott's final axiom, the Reflection schema, is identical to the above existence premise bearing the same name, and likewise does duty for ZF's Infinity and Replacement. Scott's system has the same strength as ZF.

=== Potter's theory ===
Potter (1990, 2004) introduced the idiosyncratic terminology described earlier in this entry, and discarded or replaced all of Scott's axioms except Reflection; the result is ZU. ZU, like ZF, cannot be finitely axiomatized. ZU differs from ZFC in that it:

- Includes no axiom of extensionality because the usual extensionality principle follows from the definition of collection and an easy lemma.
- Admits nonwellfounded collections. However Potter (2004) never invokes such collections, and all sets (collections which are contained in a level) are wellfounded. No theorem in Potter would be overturned if an axiom stating that all collections are sets were added to ZU.
- Includes no equivalents of Choice or the axiom schema of Replacement.

Hence ZU is closer to the Zermelo set theory of 1908, namely ZFC minus Choice, Replacement, and Foundation. It is stronger than this theory, however, since cardinals and ordinals can be defined, despite the absence of Choice, using Scott's trick and the existence of levels, and no such definition is possible in Zermelo set theory. Thus in ZU, an equivalence class of:

- Equinumerous sets from a common level is a cardinal number;
- Isomorphic well-orderings, also from a common level, is an ordinal number.

Similarly the natural numbers are not defined as a particular set within the iterative hierarchy, but as models of a "pure" Dedekind algebra. "Dedekind algebra" is Potter's name for a set closed under a unary injective operation, successor, whose domain contains a unique element, zero, absent from its range. Because the theory of Dedekind algebras is categorical (all models are isomorphic), any such algebra can proxy for the natural numbers.

Although Potter (2004) devotes an entire appendix to proper classes, the strength and merits of Scott–Potter set theory relative to the well-known rivals to ZFC that admit proper classes, namely NBG and Morse–Kelley set theory, have yet to be explored.

Scott–Potter set theory resembles NFU in that the latter is a recently (Jensen 1967) devised axiomatic set theory admitting both urelements and sets that are not well-founded. But the urelements of NFU, unlike those of ZU, play an essential role; they and the resulting restrictions on Extensionality make possible a proof of NFU's consistency relative to Peano arithmetic. But nothing is known about the strength of NFU relative to Creation+Separation, NFU+Infinity relative to ZU, and of NFU+Infinity+Countable Choice relative to ZU + Countable Choice.

Unlike nearly all writing on set theory in recent decades, Potter (2004) mentions mereological fusions. His collections are also synonymous with the "virtual sets" of Willard Quine and Richard Milton Martin: entities arising from the free use of the principle of comprehension that can never be admitted to the universe of discourse.

== See also ==
- Foundation of mathematics
- Hierarchy (mathematics)
- List of set theory topics
- Philosophy of mathematics
- S (Boolos 1989)
- Von Neumann universe
- Zermelo set theory
- ZFC
