= List of alternative set theories =

Alternative to the standard Zermelo–Fraenkel set theory

In mathematical logic, an alternative set theory is any of the alternative mathematical approaches to the concept of set and any alternative to the de facto standard set theory described in axiomatic set theory by the axioms of Zermelo–Fraenkel set theory.

== Alternative set theories ==
Alternative set theories include:

- Vopěnka's alternative set theory
- Von Neumann–Bernays–Gödel set theory
- Morse–Kelley set theory
- Tarski–Grothendieck set theory
- Ackermann set theory
- Type theory
- New Foundations
- Positive set theory
- Internal set theory
- Pocket set theory
- Naive set theory
- S (set theory)
- Double extension set theory
- Kripke–Platek set theory
- Kripke–Platek set theory with urelements
- Scott–Potter set theory
- Constructive set theory
- Zermelo set theory
- General set theory
- Mac Lane set theory

== See also ==
- Non-well-founded set theory
- List of first-order theories § Set theories
