= Double extension set theory =

Axiomatic set theory

In mathematics, the Double extension set theory (DEST) is an axiomatic set theory proposed by Andrzej Kisielewicz consisting of two separate membership relations on the universe of sets, denoted here by $\in$ and $\varepsilon$, and a set of axioms relating the two. The intention behind defining the two membership relations is to avoid the usual paradoxes of set theory, without substantially weakening the axiom of unrestricted comprehension.

Intuitively, in DEST, comprehension is used to define the elements of a set under one membership relation using formulas that involve only the other membership relation. Let $\phi(x)$ be a first-order formula with free variable $x$ in the language of DEST not involving the membership relation $\varepsilon$. Then, the axioms of DEST posit a set $A = \{ x | \phi(x)\}$ such that $x \varepsilon A \iff \phi(x)$. For instance, $x \notin x$ is a formula involving only $\in$, and thus DEST posits the Russell set $R = \{ x | x \notin x\}$, where $x \varepsilon R \iff x \notin x$. Observe that for $x = R$, we obtain $R \varepsilon R \iff R \notin R$. Since the membership relations are different, we thus avoid the Russell's paradox.

The focus in DEST is on regular sets, which are sets whose extensions under the two membership relations coincide, i.e., sets $A$ for which it holds that $\forall x. x \in A \iff x \varepsilon A$. The preceding discussion suggests that the Russell set $R = \{ x | x \notin x\}$ cannot be regular, as otherwise it leads to the Russell's paradox.
