= Paradoxes of set theory =

This article contains a discussion of paradoxes of set theory. As with most mathematical paradoxes, they generally reveal surprising and counter-intuitive mathematical results, rather than actual logical contradictions within modern axiomatic set theory.

== Basics ==
=== Cardinal numbers ===
Set theory as conceived by Georg Cantor assumes the existence of infinite sets. As this assumption cannot be proved from first principles it has been introduced into axiomatic set theory by the axiom of infinity, which asserts the existence of the set N of natural numbers. Every infinite set which can be enumerated by natural numbers is the same size (cardinality) as N, and is said to be countable. Examples of countably infinite sets are the natural numbers, the even numbers, the prime numbers, and also all the rational numbers, i.e., the fractions. These sets have in common the cardinal number |N| = $\aleph_0$ (aleph-nought), a number greater than every natural number.

Cardinal numbers can be defined as follows. Define two sets to have the same size by: there exists a bijection between the two sets (a one-to-one correspondence between the elements). Then a cardinal number is, by definition, a class consisting of all sets of the same size. To have the same size is an equivalence relation, and the cardinal numbers are the equivalence classes.

=== Ordinal numbers ===
Besides the cardinality, which describes the size of a set, ordered sets also form a subject of set theory. The axiom of choice guarantees that every set can be well-ordered, which means that a total order can be imposed on its elements such that every nonempty subset has a first element with respect to that order. The order of a well-ordered set is described by an ordinal number. For instance, 3 is the ordinal number of the set {0, 1, 2} with the usual order 0 < 1 < 2; and ω is the ordinal number of the set of all natural numbers ordered the usual way. Neglecting the order, we are left with the cardinal number |N| = |ω| = $\aleph_0$.

Ordinal numbers can be defined with the same method used for cardinal numbers. Define two well-ordered sets to have the same order type by: there exists a bijection between the two sets respecting the order: smaller elements are mapped to smaller elements. Then an ordinal number is, by definition, a class consisting of all well-ordered sets of the same order type. To have the same order type is an equivalence relation on the class of well-ordered sets, and the ordinal numbers are the equivalence classes.

Two sets of the same order type have the same cardinality. The converse is not true in general for infinite sets: it is possible to impose different well-orderings on the set of natural numbers that give rise to different ordinal numbers.

There is a natural ordering on the ordinals, which is itself a well-ordering. Given any ordinal α, one can consider the set of all ordinals less than α. This set turns out to have ordinal number α. This observation is used for a different way of introducing the ordinals, in which an ordinal is equated with the set of all smaller ordinals. This form of ordinal number is thus a canonical representative of the earlier form of equivalence class.

=== Power sets ===
All subsets of a set S (all possible choices of its elements) form the power set P(S). Georg Cantor proved that the power set is always larger than the set, i.e., |P(S)| > |S|. A special case of Cantor's theorem is that the set of all real numbers R cannot be enumerated by natural numbers, that is, R is uncountable: |R| > |N|.

== Paradoxes of the infinite sets ==
Instead of relying on ambiguous descriptions such as "that which cannot be enlarged" or "increasing without bound", set theory provides definitions for the term infinite set to give an unambiguous meaning to phrases such as "the set of all natural numbers is infinite". Just as for finite sets, the theory makes further definitions which allow us to consistently compare two infinite sets as regards whether one set is "larger than", "smaller than", or "the same size as" the other. But not every intuition regarding the size of finite sets applies to the size of infinite sets, leading to various apparently paradoxical results regarding enumeration, size, measure and order.

=== Paradoxes of enumeration ===
Before set theory was introduced, the notion of the size of a set had been problematic. It had been discussed by Galileo Galilei and Bernard Bolzano, among others. Are there as many natural numbers as squares of natural numbers when measured by the method of enumeration?

- The answer is yes, because for every natural number n there is a square number n^{2}, and likewise the other way around.
- The answer is no, because the squares are a proper subset of the naturals: every square is a natural number but there are natural numbers, like 2, which are not squares of natural numbers.

The issue can be settled by defining the size of a set in terms of its cardinality. Since a bijection exists between the two sets, they have the same cardinality by definition.

Hilbert's paradox of the Grand Hotel illustrates more paradoxes of enumeration.

=== Je le vois, mais je ne crois pas ===
"I see it but I don't believe," Cantor wrote to Richard Dedekind after proving that the set of points of a square has the same cardinality as that of the points on just an edge of the square: the cardinality of the continuum.

This demonstrates that the "size" of sets as defined by cardinality alone is not the only useful way of comparing sets. Measure theory provides a more nuanced theory of size that conforms to our intuition that length and area are incompatible measures of size.

The evidence strongly suggests that Cantor was quite confident in the result itself and that his comment to Dedekind refers instead to his then-still-lingering concerns about the validity of his proof of it. Nevertheless, Cantor's remark would also serve nicely to express the surprise that so many mathematicians after him have experienced on first encountering a result that is so counter-intuitive.

=== Paradoxes of well-ordering ===
In 1904 Ernst Zermelo proved by means of the axiom of choice (which was introduced for this reason) that every set can be well-ordered. In 1963 Paul J. Cohen showed that in Zermelo–Fraenkel set theory without the axiom of choice it is not possible to prove the existence of a well-ordering of the real numbers.

However, the ability to well order any set allows certain constructions to be performed that have been called paradoxical. One example is the Banach–Tarski paradox, a theorem widely considered to be nonintuitive. It states that it is possible to decompose a ball of a fixed radius into a finite number of pieces and then move and reassemble those pieces by ordinary translations and rotations (with no scaling) to obtain two copies from the one original copy. The construction of these pieces requires the axiom of choice; the pieces are not simple regions of the ball, but complicated subsets.

== Paradoxes of the Supertask ==
In set theory, an infinite set is not considered to be created by some mathematical process such as "adding one element" that is then carried out "an infinite number of times". Instead, a particular infinite set (such as the set of all natural numbers) is said to already exist, "by fiat", as an assumption or an axiom. Given this infinite set, other infinite sets are then proven to exist as well, as a logical consequence. But it is still a natural philosophical question to contemplate some physical action that actually completes after an infinite number of discrete steps; and the interpretation of this question using set theory gives rise to the paradoxes of the supertask.

=== The diary of Tristram Shandy ===
Tristram Shandy, the hero of a novel by Laurence Sterne, writes his autobiography so conscientiously that it takes him one year to lay down the events of one day. If he is mortal he can never terminate; but if he lived forever then no part of his diary would remain unwritten, for to each day of his life a year devoted to that day's description would correspond.

=== The Ross-Littlewood paradox ===
An increased version of this type of paradox shifts the infinitely remote finish to a finite time. Fill a huge reservoir with balls enumerated by numbers 1 to 10 and take off ball number 1. Then add the balls enumerated by numbers 11 to 20 and take off number 2. Continue to add balls enumerated by numbers 10n - 9 to 10n and to remove ball number n for all natural numbers n = 3, 4, 5, .... Let the first transaction last half an hour, let the second transaction last quarter an hour, and so on, so that all transactions are finished after one hour. Obviously the set of balls in the reservoir increases without bound. Nevertheless, after one hour the reservoir is empty because for every ball the time of removal is known.

The paradox is further increased by the significance of the removal sequence. If the balls are not removed in the sequence 1, 2, 3, ... but in the sequence 1, 11, 21, ... after one hour infinitely many balls populate the reservoir, although the same amount of material as before has been moved.

== Paradoxes of proof and definability ==
For all its usefulness in resolving questions regarding infinite sets, naive set theory has some fatal flaws. In particular, it is prey to logical paradoxes such as those exposed by Russell's paradox. The discovery of these paradoxes revealed that not all sets which can be described in the language of naive set theory can actually be said to exist without creating a contradiction. The 20th century saw a resolution to these paradoxes in the development of the various axiomatizations of set theories such as ZFC and NBG in common use today. However, the gap between the very formalized and symbolic language of these theories and our typical informal use of mathematical language results in various paradoxical situations, as well as the philosophical question of exactly what it is that such formal systems actually propose to be talking about.

=== Early paradoxes of naive set theory: Burali-Forti and Russell ===
In 1897 the Italian mathematician Cesare Burali-Forti discovered what is now known as the Burali-Forti paradox: the set of all ordinal numbers does not exist. If it did, it would be well-ordered and therefore itself determine an ordinal number Ω, leading to the contradiction Ω < Ω.

By the end of the 19th century Cantor was aware of the non-existence of the set of all cardinal numbers and the set of all ordinal numbers. In letters to David Hilbert and Richard Dedekind he wrote about inconsistent sets, the elements of which cannot be thought of as being all together, and he used this result to prove that every consistent set has a cardinal number.

Bertrand Russell described what is now known as Russell's paradox in a letter in 1902: the set of all sets that do not contain themselves, {x | x is not an element of x}, cannot exist. If it did, both the assumption that it contain itself, and the assumption that it does not contain itself, would lead to a contradiction. Russell himself explained this abstract idea by means of some very concrete pictures. One example, known as the Barber paradox, states: The male barber who shaves all and only men who do not shave themselves has to shave himself only if he does not shave himself.

There are close similarities between Russell's paradox in set theory and the Grelling–Nelson paradox, which demonstrates a paradox in natural language.

=== Paradoxes by change of language ===
==== König's paradox ====
In 1905, the Hungarian mathematician Julius König published a paradox based on the fact that there are only countably many finite definitions. If we imagine the real numbers as a well-ordered set, those real numbers which can be finitely defined form a subset. Hence in this well-order there should be a first real number that is not finitely definable. This is paradoxical, because this real number has just been finitely defined by the last sentence. This leads to a contradiction in naive set theory.

This paradox is avoided in axiomatic set theory. Although it is possible to represent a proposition about a set as a set, by a system of codes known as Gödel numbers, there is no formula $\varphi(a,x)$ in the language of set theory which holds exactly when $a$ is a code for a finite proposition about a set, $x$ is a set, and $a$ holds for $x$. This result is known as Tarski's indefinability theorem; it applies to a wide class of formal systems including all commonly studied axiomatizations of set theory.

==== Richard's paradox ====
In the same year the French mathematician Jules Richard used a variant of Cantor's diagonal method to obtain another contradiction in naive set theory. Consider the set A of all finite agglomerations of words. The set E of all finite definitions of real numbers is a subset of A. As A is countable, so is E. Let p be the nth decimal of the nth real number defined by the set E; we form a number N having zero for the integral part and p + 1 for the nth decimal if p is not equal either to 8 or 9, and unity if p is equal to 8 or 9. This number N is not defined by the set E because it differs from any finitely defined real number, namely from the nth number by the nth digit. But N has been defined by a finite number of words in this paragraph. It should therefore be in the set E. That is a contradiction.

As with König's paradox, this paradox cannot be formalized in axiomatic set theory because it requires the ability to tell whether a description applies to a particular set (or, equivalently, to tell whether a formula is actually the definition of a single set).

=== Paradox of Löwenheim and Skolem ===
Based upon work of the German mathematician Leopold Löwenheim (1915) the Norwegian logician Thoralf Skolem showed in 1922 that every consistent theory of first-order predicate calculus, such as set theory, has an at most countable model. However, Cantor's theorem proves that there are uncountable sets. The root of this seeming paradox is that the countability or noncountability of a set is not always absolute, but can depend on the model in which the cardinality is measured. It is possible for a set to be uncountable in one model of set theory but countable in a larger model (because the bijections that establish countability are in the larger model but not the smaller one).

== See also ==
- Proof of impossibility
- Berry paradox
