= Zermelo set theory =

System of mathematical set theory

Zermelo set theory (sometimes denoted by Z^{-}), as set out in a seminal paper in 1908 by Ernst Zermelo, is the ancestor of modern Zermelo–Fraenkel set theory (ZF) and its extensions, such as von Neumann–Bernays–Gödel set theory (NBG). It bears certain differences from its descendants, which are not always understood, and are frequently misquoted. This article sets out the original axioms, with the original text (translated into English) and original numbering.

== The axioms of Zermelo set theory ==
The axioms of Zermelo set theory are stated for objects, some of which (but not necessarily all) are sets, and the remaining objects are urelements and not sets. Zermelo's language implicitly includes a membership relation ∈, an equality relation = (if it is not included in the underlying logic), and a unary predicate saying whether an object is a set. Later versions of set theory often assume that all objects are sets so there are no urelements and there is no need for the unary predicate.

1. AXIOM I. Axiom of extensionality (Axiom der Bestimmtheit) "If every element of a set M is also an element of N and vice versa ... then M $\equiv$ N. Briefly, every set is determined by its elements."
2. AXIOM II. Axiom of elementary sets (Axiom der Elementarmengen) "There exists a set, the null set, ∅, that contains no element at all. If a is any object of the domain, there exists a set {a} containing a and only a as an element. If a and b are any two objects of the domain, there always exists a set {a, b} containing as elements a and b but no object x distinct from them both." See Axiom of empty set and Axiom of pairing.
3. AXIOM III. Axiom of separation (Axiom der Aussonderung) "Whenever the propositional function –(x) is defined for all elements of a set M, M possesses a subset M' containing as elements precisely those elements x of M for which –(x) is true."
4. AXIOM IV. Axiom of the power set (Axiom der Potenzmenge) "To every set T there corresponds a set T' , the power set of T, that contains as elements precisely all subsets of T ."
5. AXIOM V. Axiom of the union (Axiom der Vereinigung) "To every set T there corresponds a set ∪T, the union of T, that contains as elements precisely all elements of the elements of T ."
6. AXIOM VI. Axiom of choice (Axiom der Auswahl) "If T is a set whose elements all are sets that are different from ∅ and mutually disjoint, its union ∪T includes at least one subset S_{1} having one and only one element in common with each element of T ."
7. AXIOM VII. Axiom of infinity (Axiom des Unendlichen) "There exists in the domain at least one set Z that contains the null set as an element and is so constituted that to each of its elements a there corresponds a further element of the form {a}, in other words, that with each of its elements a it also contains the corresponding set {a} as element."

== Connection with standard set theory ==
The most widely used and accepted set theory is known as ZFC, which consists of Zermelo–Fraenkel set theory including the axiom of choice (AC). The links show where the axioms of Zermelo's theory correspond. There is no exact match for the "axiom of elementary sets". It can be broken down into the empty set axiom, pairing axiom and an additional axiom asserting the existence of singleton sets. However, the existence of singletons can be derived within Zermelo set theory as follows, if a exists, a and a exist, thus by pairing {a,a} exists, and so by extensionality {a,a} = {a}. The empty set axiom is also already assumed by Zermelo's statement of the axiom of infinity.

Zermelo set theory does not include the axioms of replacement and regularity. The axiom of replacement was first published in 1922 by Abraham Fraenkel and Thoralf Skolem, who had independently discovered that Zermelo's axioms cannot prove the existence of the set {Z_{0}, Z_{1}, Z_{2}, ...} where Z_{0} is the set of natural numbers and Z_{n+1} is the power set of Z_{n}. They both realized that the axiom of replacement is needed to prove this. The following year, John von Neumann pointed out that the axiom of regularity is necessary to build his theory of ordinals. The axiom of regularity was stated by von Neumann in 1925.

In the modern ZFC system, the "propositional function" referred to in the axiom of separation is interpreted as "any property definable by a first-order formula with parameters", so the separation axiom is replaced by an axiom schema. The notion of "first-order formula" was not known in 1908 when Zermelo published his axiom system, and he later rejected this interpretation as being too restrictive. Zermelo set theory is usually taken to be a first-order theory with the separation axiom replaced by an axiom scheme with an axiom for each first-order formula. It can also be considered as a theory in second-order logic, where now the separation axiom is just a single axiom. The second-order interpretation of Zermelo set theory is probably closer to Zermelo's own conception of it, and is stronger than the first-order interpretation. The empty set axiom is no longer usually included in axiomatizations of set theory because it follows from the axiom (schema) of separation for any contradictory formula such as $x \neq x$.

Since $(V_\lambda , V_{\lambda + 1})$—where $V_\alpha$ is the rank-$\alpha$ set in the cumulative hierarchy—forms a model of second-order Zermelo set theory within ZFC whenever $\lambda$ is a limit ordinal greater than the smallest infinite ordinal $\omega$, it follows that the consistency of second-order Zermelo set theory (and therefore also that of first-order Zermelo set theory) is a theorem of ZFC. If we let $\lambda = \omega \cdot 2$, the existence of an uncountable strong limit cardinal is not satisfied in such a model; thus the existence of ℶ_{ω} (the smallest uncountable strong limit cardinal) cannot be proved in second-order Zermelo set theory. Similarly, the set $V_{\omega \cdot 2} \cap L$ (where L is the constructible universe) forms a model of first-order Zermelo set theory wherein the existence of an uncountable weak limit cardinal is not satisfied, showing that first-order Zermelo set theory cannot even prove the existence of the smallest singular cardinal, $\aleph_\omega$. Within such a model, the only infinite cardinals are the aleph numbers restricted to finite index ordinals.

The axiom of infinity is usually now modified to assert the existence of the first infinite von Neumann ordinal $\omega$; the original Zermelo axioms cannot prove the existence of this set, nor can the modified Zermelo axioms prove Zermelo's axiom of infinity. Zermelo's axioms (original or modified) cannot prove the existence of $V_{\omega}$ as a set nor of any rank of the cumulative hierarchy of sets with infinite index. In any formulation, Zermelo set theory cannot prove the existence of the von Neumann ordinal $\omega \cdot 2$, despite proving the existence of such an order type; thus the von Neumann definition of ordinals is not employed for Zermelo set theory.

Zermelo allowed for the existence of urelements that are not sets and contain no elements; these are now usually omitted from set theories.

== Mac Lane set theory ==
Mac Lane set theory, introduced by Mac Lane (1986), is Zermelo set theory with the axiom of separation restricted to first-order formulas in which every quantifier is bounded. Mac Lane set theory is similar in strength to topos theory with a natural number object, or to the system in Principia mathematica. It is strong enough to carry out almost all ordinary mathematics not directly connected with set theory or logic.

== The aim of Zermelo's paper ==
The introduction states that the very existence of the discipline of set theory "seems to be threatened by certain contradictions or "antinomies", that can be derived from its principles – principles necessarily governing our thinking, it seems – and to which no entirely satisfactory solution has yet been found". Zermelo is referring to the Russell antinomy, among others.

He says he wants to show how the original theory of Georg Cantor and Richard Dedekind can be reduced to a few definitions and seven principles or axioms. He says he has not been able to prove that the axioms are consistent.

A non-constructivist argument for their consistency goes as follows. Define V_{α} for α one of the ordinals 0, 1, 2, ...,ω, ω+1, ω+2,..., ω·2 as follows:

- V_{0} is the empty set.
- For α a successor of the form β+1, V_{α} is defined to be the collection of all subsets of V_{β}.
- For α a limit (e.g. ω, ω·2) then V_{α} is defined to be the union of V_{β} for β<α.

Then the axioms of Zermelo set theory are consistent because they are true in the model V_{ω·2}. While a non-constructivist might regard this as a valid argument, a constructivist would probably not: while there are no problems with the construction of the sets up to V_{ω}, the construction of V_{ω+1} is less clear because one cannot constructively define every subset of V_{ω}. This argument can be turned into a valid proof with the addition of a single new axiom of infinity to Zermelo set theory, simply that V_{ω·2} exists. This is presumably not convincing for a constructivist, but it shows that the consistency of Zermelo set theory can be proved with a theory that is not very different from Zermelo theory itself, only a little more powerful.

== The axiom of separation ==
Zermelo comments that Axiom III of his system is the one responsible for eliminating the antinomies. It differs from the original definition by Cantor, as follows.

Sets cannot be independently defined by any arbitrary logically definable notion. They must be constructed in some way from previously constructed sets. For example, they can be constructed by taking powersets, or they can be separated as subsets of sets already "given". This, he says, eliminates contradictory ideas like "the set of all sets" or "the set of all ordinal numbers".

He disposes of the Russell paradox by means of this Theorem: "Every set $M$ possesses at least one subset $M_0$ that is not an element of $M$." Let $M_0$ be the subset of $M$ that, by AXIOM III, is separated out by the notion "$x \notin x$". Then $M_0$ cannot be in $M$. For

1. If $M_0$ is in $M_0$, then $M_0$ contains an element x for which x is in x (i.e. $M_0$ itself), which would contradict the definition of $M_0$.
2. If $M_0$ is not in $M_0$, and assuming $M_0$ is an element of M, then $M_0$ is an element of M that satisfies the definition "$x \notin x$", and so is in $M_0$, which is a contradiction.

Therefore, the assumption that $M_0$ is in $M$ is wrong, proving the theorem. Hence not all objects of the universal domain B can be elements of one and the same set. "This disposes of the Russell antinomy as far as we are concerned."

This left the problem of "the domain B", which seems to refer to something. This led to the idea of a proper class.

== Cantor's theorem ==
Zermelo's paper may be the first to mention the name "Cantor's theorem". Cantor's theorem: "If M is an arbitrary set, then always M < P(M) [the power set of M]. Every set is of lower cardinality than the set of its subsets".

Zermelo proves this by considering a function φ: M → P(M). By Axiom III this defines the following set M' :

M' = {m: m ∉ φ(m)}.

But no element m' of M could correspond to M' , i.e. such that φ(m' ) = M' . Otherwise we can construct a contradiction:

1. If m' is in M' then by definition m' ∉ φ(m' ) = M' , which is the first part of the contradiction
2. If m' is not in M' but in M then by definition m' ∉ M' = φ(m' ), which by definition implies that m' is in M' , which is the second part of the contradiction.

so by contradiction m' does not exist. Note the close resemblance of this proof to the way Zermelo disposes of Russell's paradox.

== See also ==
- S (set theory)
