= Subclass (set theory) =

Class that is contained in another class

In set theory and its applications throughout mathematics, a subclass is a class contained in some other class in the same way that a subset is a set contained in some other set. One may also call this "inclusion of classes".

That is, given classes A and B, A is a subclass of B if and only if every member of A is also a member of B. In fact, when using a definition of classes that requires them to be first-order definable, it is enough that B be a set; the axiom of specification essentially says that A must then also be a set.

As with subsets, the empty set is a subclass of every class, and any class is a subclass of itself. But additionally, every class is a subclass of the class of all sets. Accordingly, the subclass relation makes the collection of all classes into a Boolean lattice, which the subset relation does not do for the collection of all sets. Instead, the collection of all sets is an ideal in the collection of all classes. (Of course, the collection of all classes is something larger than even a class!)
