= Universal set =

Mathematical set containing all objects

In set theory, a universal set is a set that contains all of the objects in the theory, including itself. In set theory as usually formulated, it can be proven in multiple ways that a universal set does not exist. However, some non-standard variants of set theory include a universal set.

== Reasons for nonexistence ==
Many set theories do not allow for the existence of a universal set. There are several different arguments for its non-existence, based on different choices of axioms for set theory.

=== Russell's paradox ===
Russell's paradox concerns the impossibility of a set of sets, whose members are all sets that do not contain themselves. If such a set could exist, it could neither contain itself (because its members all do not contain themselves) nor avoid containing itself (because if it did, it should be included as one of its members). This paradox prevents the existence of a universal set in set theories that include either Zermelo's axiom of restricted comprehension, or the axiom of regularity and axiom of pairing.

==== Regularity and pairing ====
In Zermelo–Fraenkel set theory, the axiom of regularity and axiom of pairing prevent any set from containing itself. For any set $A$, the set $\{A\}$ (constructed using pairing) necessarily contains an element disjoint from $\{A\}$, by regularity. Because its only element is $A$, it must be the case that $A$ is disjoint from $\{A\}$, and therefore that $A$ does not contain itself. Because a universal set would necessarily contain itself, it cannot exist under these axioms.

==== Comprehension ====
Russell's paradox prevents the existence of a universal set in set theories that include Zermelo's axiom of restricted comprehension. This axiom states that, for any formula $\varphi(x)$ and any set $A$, there exists a set
$$\{x \in A \mid \varphi(x)\}$$
that contains exactly those elements $x$ of $A$ that satisfy $\varphi$.

If this axiom could be applied to a universal set $A$, with $\varphi(x)$ defined as the predicate $x\notin x$, it would state the existence of Russell's paradoxical set, giving a contradiction. It was this contradiction that led the axiom of comprehension to be stated in its restricted form, where it asserts the existence of a subset of a given set rather than the existence of a set of all sets that satisfy a given formula.

When the axiom of restricted comprehension is applied to an arbitrary set $A$, with the predicate $\varphi(x)\equiv x\notin x$, it produces the subset of elements of $A$ that do not contain themselves. It cannot be a member of $A$, because if it were it would be included as a member of itself, by its definition, contradicting the fact that it cannot contain itself. In this way, it is possible to construct a witness to the non-universality of $A$, even in versions of set theory that allow sets to contain themselves. This indeed holds even with predicative comprehension and over intuitionistic logic.

=== Cantor's theorem ===
Another difficulty with the idea of a universal set concerns the power set of the set of all sets. Because this power set is a set of sets, it would necessarily be a subset of the set of all sets, provided that both exist. However, this conflicts with Cantor's theorem that the power set of any set (whether infinite or not) always has strictly higher cardinality than the set itself.

== Theories of universality ==
The difficulties associated with a universal set can be avoided either by using a variant of set theory in which the axiom of comprehension is restricted in some way, or by using a universal object that is not considered to be a set.

=== Restricted comprehension ===
There are set theories known to be consistent (if the usual set theory is consistent) in which the universal set V does exist (and $V \in V$ is true). In these theories, Zermelo's axiom of comprehension does not hold in general, and the axiom of comprehension of naive set theory is restricted in a different way. A set theory containing a universal set is necessarily a non-well-founded set theory. The most widely studied set theory with a universal set is Willard Van Orman Quine's New Foundations. Alonzo Church and Arnold Oberschelp also published work on such set theories. Church speculated that his theory might be extended in a manner consistent with Quine's, but this is not possible for Oberschelp's, since in it the singleton function is provably a set, which leads immediately to paradox in New Foundations.

Another example is positive set theory, where the axiom of comprehension is restricted to hold only for the positive formulas (formulas that do not contain negations). Such set theories are motivated by notions of closure in topology.

=== Universal objects that are not sets ===
The idea of a universal set seems intuitively desirable in the Zermelo–Fraenkel set theory, particularly because most versions of this theory do allow the use of quantifiers over all sets (see universal quantifier). One way of allowing an object that behaves similarly to a universal set, without creating paradoxes, is to describe V and similar large collections as proper classes rather than as sets. Russell's paradox does not apply in these theories because the axiom of comprehension operates on sets, not on classes.

The category of sets can also be considered to be a universal object that is, again, not itself a set. It has all sets as elements, and also includes arrows for all functions from one set to another. Again, it does not contain itself, because it is not itself a set.

== See also ==
- Grothendieck universe
- Domain of discourse
- Von Neumann–Bernays–Gödel set theory — an extension of ZFC that admits the class of all sets
