= Axiom of regularity =

Axiom of set theory

In mathematics, the axiom of regularity (also known as the axiom of foundation) is an axiom of Zermelo–Fraenkel set theory that states that every non-empty set A contains an element that is disjoint from A. In first-order logic, the axiom reads:

$$\forall x\,(x \neq \varnothing \rightarrow (\exists y \in x) (x \cap y = \varnothing)).$$

The axiom of regularity together with the axiom of pairing implies that no set is an element of itself, and that there is no infinite sequence $(a_n)$ such that $a_{i+1}$ is an element of $a_i$ for all $i$. With the axiom of dependent choice (which is a weakened form of the axiom of choice), this result can be reversed: if there are no such infinite sequences, then the axiom of regularity is true. Hence, in this context the axiom of regularity is equivalent to the sentence that there are no downward infinite membership chains.

The axiom was originally formulated by von Neumann; it was adopted in a formulation closer to the one found in contemporary textbooks by Zermelo. Virtually all results in the branches of mathematics based on set theory hold even in the absence of regularity. However, regularity makes some properties of ordinals easier to prove; and it not only allows induction to be done on well-ordered sets but also on proper classes that are well-founded relational structures such as the lexicographical ordering on $\{ (n, \alpha) \mid n \in \omega \land \alpha \text{ is an ordinal } \} \,.$

Given the other axioms of Zermelo–Fraenkel set theory, the axiom of regularity is equivalent to the axiom of induction. The axiom of induction tends to be used in place of the axiom of regularity in intuitionistic theories (ones that do not accept the law of the excluded middle), where the two axioms are not equivalent.

In addition to omitting the axiom of regularity, non-standard set theories have indeed postulated the existence of sets that are elements of themselves.

== Elementary implications of regularity ==
=== No set is an element of itself ===
Let $A$ be a set, and apply the axiom of regularity to $\{A\}$, which is a set by the axiom of pairing. By this axiom, there must be an element of $\{A\}$ which is disjoint from $\{A\}$. Since the only element of $\{A\}$ is $A$, it must be that $A$ is disjoint from $\{A\}$. So, since $A \cap \{A\} = \varnothing$, we cannot have $A$ an element of $A$ (by the definition of disjointness).

=== For every two sets, only one can be an element of the other (no membership 2-cycles) ===
Let X and Y be sets. Then apply the axiom of regularity to the set {X,Y} (which exists by the axiom of pairing). We see there must be an element of {X,Y} that is also disjoint from it. It must be either X or Y. By the definition of disjoint then, we must have either Y is not an element of X or vice versa.

=== No membership cycles of any length can exist ===
Suppose there exists a finite sequence of sets $A_0, A_1, ..., A_n$ satisfying the cyclic membership property: $A_n \in A_0 \land \forall i < n (A_i \in A_{i+1})$. Then, let $A_+=\{A_0, A_1, ..., A_n\}$. $A_+$ can be shown to exist through a combination of the axioms of pairing and union. $A_+$ can't be disjoint with $A_0$, since both contain $A_n$. For any $1 \le j \le n$, $A_+$ and $A_j$ both contain $A_{j-1}$.

In total, this means no element of $A_+$ is disjoint with $A_+$, contradicting the axiom of regularity. So $A_+$ cannot exist, meaning no sequence of sets satisfying the cyclic membership property can exist.

The nonexistence of a set containing itself is the special case of this. In particular, a membership 1-cycle.

=== No infinite descending sequence of sets exists ===
Suppose, to the contrary, that there is a function, f, on the natural numbers with f(n+1) an element of f(n) for each n. Define S = {f(n): n a natural number}, the range of f, which can be seen to be a set from the axiom schema of replacement. Applying the axiom of regularity to S, let B be an element of S, which is disjoint from S. By the definition of S, B must be f(k) for some natural number k. However, we are given that f(k) contains f(k+1), which is also an element of S. So f(k+1) is in the intersection of f(k) and S. This contradicts the fact that they are disjoint sets. Since our supposition led to a contradiction, there must not be any such function, f.

Cyclic membership can be seen as a special case where the infinite descending sequence repeats. Self-membership can be seen as a special case where the infinite descending sequence is the one set repeated infinitely.

Notice that this argument only applies to functions f that can be represented as sets as opposed to undefinable classes. The hereditarily finite sets, V_{ω}, satisfy the axiom of regularity (and all other axioms of ZFC except the axiom of infinity). So if one forms a non-trivial ultrapower of V_{ω}, then it will also satisfy the axiom of regularity. The resulting structure will contain elements, called non-standard natural numbers, that satisfy the definition of natural numbers in that structure but are not really natural numbers. They are "fake" natural numbers that are "larger" than any actual natural number. This structure will contain infinite descending (with respect to the interpretation of $\in$ in the structure) sequences of elements. For example, suppose n is a non-standard natural number, then $(n-1) \in n$ and $(n-2) \in (n-1)$, and so on. For any actual natural number k, $(n-k-1) \in (n-k)$. This is an unending descending sequence of elements. But this sequence is not definable in the structure and thus not a set. So no contradiction to regularity can be proved.

=== Simpler set-theoretic definition of the ordered pair ===
The axiom of regularity enables defining the ordered pair (a,b) as {a,{a,b}}; see ordered pair for specifics. This definition eliminates one pair of braces from the canonical Kuratowski definition (a,b) = {{a},{a,b}}.

=== Every set has an ordinal rank ===
The original form of the axiom by von Neumann stated this.

To prove it from the axiom of regularity, suppose x is any set. Let t be the transitive closure of {x}. Let u be the subset of t consisting of unranked sets. If u is empty, then x is ranked and we are done. Otherwise, apply the axiom of regularity to u to get an element w of u that is disjoint from u. Since w is in u, w is unranked. w is a subset of t by the definition of transitive closure. Since w is disjoint from u, every element of w is ranked. Applying the axioms of replacement and union to combine the ranks of the elements of w, we get an ordinal rank for w, to wit $\textstyle \operatorname{rank} (w) = \cup \{ \operatorname{rank} (z) + 1 \mid z \in w \}$. This contradicts the conclusion that w is unranked. So the assumption that u was non-empty must be false and x must have rank.

== The axiom of dependent choice and no infinite descending sequence of sets implies regularity ==
Let the non-empty set S be a counter-example to the axiom of regularity; that is, every element of S has a non-empty intersection with S. We define a binary relation R on S by $aRb :\Leftrightarrow b \in S \cap a$, which is entire by assumption. Thus, by the axiom of dependent choice, there is some sequence (a_{n}) in S satisfying a_{n}Ra_{n+1} for all n in N. As this is an infinite descending chain, we arrive at a contradiction and so, no such S exists.

== Regularity and the rest of ZF(C) axioms ==
Regularity was shown to be relatively consistent with the rest of ZF by Skolem and von Neumann, meaning that if ZF without regularity is consistent, then ZF (with regularity) is also consistent.

The axiom of regularity was also shown to be independent from the other axioms of ZFC, assuming they are consistent. The result was announced by Paul Bernays in 1941, although he did not publish a proof until 1954. The proof involves (and led to the study of) Rieger–Bernays permutation models (or method), which were used for other proofs of independence for non-well-founded systems.

== Regularity in ordinary mathematics ==
The axiom of regularity is rarely useful outside of set theory; A. A. Fraenkel, Y. Bar-Hillel and A. Levy noted that “its omission will not incapacitate any field of mathematics”. Its inclusion, therefore, can be considered as chiefly a clarification of what one means by “set”, as elaborated on by the Mostowski collapse lemma (which provides the converse: that not only is membership on every set a well-founded and extensional relation, but that any such relation admits a corresponding set). If one performs mathematics in a more structural setting, for example by using a type theory or structural set theory like ETCS, the axiom is not used at all, since it is not needed to prove that Set, the category of sets, forms an elementary topos.

However, it does have practical uses, especially in the absence of the axiom of choice. One application is Scott's trick for constructing equivalence classes of a relation defined on proper classes, as an alternative to postulating a Grothendieck universe; it may also be used as an alternative to choice in the proof of Frucht's theorem for infinite groups.

== Regularity and Russell's paradox ==
Naive set theory (the axiom schema of unrestricted comprehension and the axiom of extensionality) is inconsistent due to Russell's paradox. In early formalizations of sets, mathematicians and logicians avoided that contradiction by simply replacing the axiom schema of comprehension with the much weaker axiom schema of separation. However, this step alone takes one to theories of sets that are considered too weak. So some of the power of comprehension was added back via the other existence axioms of ZF set theory (pairing, union, powerset, replacement, and infinity), which may be regarded as special cases of comprehension. So far, these axioms do not seem to lead to any contradiction. Subsequently, the axiom of choice and the axiom of regularity were added to exclude models with some undesirable properties. These two axioms are known to be relatively consistent.

In the presence of the axiom schema of separation, Russell's paradox becomes a proof that there is no set of all sets. The axiom of regularity together with the axiom of pairing also prohibit such a universal set. However, Russell's paradox yields a proof that there is no "set of all sets" using the axiom schema of separation alone, without any additional axioms. In particular, ZF without the axiom of regularity already prohibits such a universal set.

If a theory is extended by adding an axiom or axioms, then any (possibly undesirable) consequences of the original theory remain consequences of the extended theory. In particular, if ZF without regularity is extended by adding regularity to get ZF, then any contradiction that followed from the original theory would still follow in the extended theory.

The existence of Quine atoms (sets that satisfy the formula equation x = {x}, i.e. have themselves as their only elements) is consistent with the theory obtained by removing the axiom of regularity from ZFC. Various non-wellfounded set theories allow "safe" circular sets, such as Quine atoms, without becoming inconsistent by means of Russell's paradox.

== Regularity, the cumulative hierarchy, and types ==
In ZF it can be proven that the class $\bigcup_{\alpha} V_\alpha$, called the von Neumann universe, is equal to the class of all sets. This statement is even equivalent to the axiom of regularity (if we work in ZF with this axiom omitted). From any model that does not satisfy the axiom of regularity, a model that satisfies it can be constructed by taking only sets in $\bigcup_{\alpha} V_\alpha$.

Herbert Enderton wrote that "The idea of rank is a descendant of Russell's concept of type". Comparing ZF with type theory, Alasdair Urquhart wrote that "Zermelo's system has the notational advantage of not containing any explicitly typed variables, although in fact it can be seen as having an implicit type structure built into it, at least if the axiom of regularity is included.

Dana Scott went further and claimed that:

The truth is that there is only one satisfactory way of avoiding the paradoxes: namely, the use of some form of the theory of types. That was at the basis of both Russell's and Zermelo's intuitions. Indeed the best way to regard Zermelo's theory is as a simplification and extension of Russell's. (We mean Russell's simple theory of types, of course.) The simplification was to make the types cumulative. Thus mixing of types is easier and annoying repetitions are avoided. Once the later types are allowed to accumulate the earlier ones, we can then easily imagine extending the types into the transfinite—just how far we want to go must necessarily be left open. Now Russell made his types explicit in his notation and Zermelo left them implicit. [emphasis in original]

In the same paper, Scott shows that an axiomatic system based on the inherent properties of the cumulative hierarchy turns out to be equivalent to ZF, including regularity.

== History ==
The concept of well-foundedness and rank of a set were both introduced by Dmitry Mirimanoff. Mirimanoff called a set x "regular" (French: ordinaire) if every descending chain x ∋ x_{1} ∋ x_{2} ∋ ... is finite. Mirimanoff however did not consider his notion of regularity (and well-foundedness) as an axiom to be observed by all sets; in later papers Mirimanoff also explored what are now called non-well-founded sets (extraordinaire in Mirimanoff's terminology).

Skolem and von Neumann pointed out that non-well-founded sets are superfluous and in the same publication von Neumann gives an axiom that excludes some, but not all, non-well-founded sets. In a subsequent publication, von Neumann gave an equivalent but more complex version of the axiom of class foundation:

$$A \neq \emptyset \rightarrow \exists x \in A\,(x \cap A = \emptyset).$$

The contemporary and final form of the axiom is due to Zermelo.

== Regularity in the presence of urelements ==
Urelements are objects that are not sets, but which can be elements of sets. In ZF set theory, there are no urelements, but in some other set theories such as ZFA, there are. In these theories, the axiom of regularity must be modified. The statement "$x \neq \emptyset$" needs to be replaced with a statement that $x$ is not empty and is not an urelement. One suitable replacement is $(\exists y)[y \in x]$, which states that x is inhabited.

== See also ==
- Non-well-founded set theory
- Scott's trick
- Epsilon-induction

== Sources ==
- Bernays, Paul Isaac (1941). "A system of axiomatic set theory. Part II". The Journal of Symbolic Logic. 6 (1): 1–17. doi:10.2307/2267281. JSTOR 2267281. S2CID 250344277.
- Bernays, Paul Isaac (1954). "A system of axiomatic set theory. Part VII" (PDF). The Journal of Symbolic Logic. 19 (2): 81–96. doi:10.2307/2268864. JSTOR 2268864. S2CID 250351655.
- Boolos, George (1971). "The iterative conception of set". Journal of Philosophy. 68 (8): 215–231. doi:10.2307/2025204. JSTOR 2025204. Reprinted in Boolos, George (1998). Logic, Logic and Logic. Harvard University Press. pp. 13–29.
- Enderton, Herbert B. (1977). Elements of Set Theory. Academic Press.
- Forster, T. (2003). Logic, induction and sets. Cambridge University Press.
- Halbeisen, Lorenz J. (2012). Combinatorial Set Theory: With a Gentle Introduction to Forcing. Springer.
- Hallett, Michael (1996) [first published 1984]. Cantorian set theory and limitation of size. Oxford University Press. ISBN 978-0-19-853283-5.
- Jech, Thomas (2003). Set Theory (Third Millennium ed.). Springer. ISBN 978-3-540-44085-7.
- Kunen, Kenneth (1980). Set Theory: An Introduction to Independence Proofs. Elsevier. ISBN 978-0-444-86839-8.
- Lévy, Azriel (2002) [first published in 1979]. Basic set theory. Mineola, New York: Dover Publications. ISBN 978-0-486-42079-0.
- Mirimanoff, Dmitry (1917). "Les antinomies de Russell et de Burali-Forti et le probleme fondamental de la theorie des ensembles". L'Enseignement Mathématique (in French). 19: 37–52.
- Rathjen, M. (2004). "Predicativity, Circularity, and Anti-Foundation" (PDF). In Link, Godehard (ed.). One Hundred Years of Russell's Paradox: Mathematics, Logic, Philosophy. Walter de Gruyter. ISBN 978-3-11-019968-0. Archived (PDF) from the original on 2022-10-09.
- Rieger, Adam (2011). "Paradox, ZF, and the Axiom of Foundation" (PDF). In DeVidi, David; Hallett, Michael; Clark, Peter (eds.). Logic, Mathematics, Philosophy, Vintage Enthusiasms. Essays in Honour of John L. Bell. The Western Ontario Series in Philosophy of Science. Vol. 75. pp. 171–187. CiteSeerX 10.1.1.100.9052. doi:10.1007/978-94-007-0214-1_9. ISBN 978-94-007-0213-4.
- Riegger, L. (1957). "A contribution to Gödel's axiomatic set theory" (PDF). Czechoslovak Mathematical Journal. 7 (3): 323–357. doi:10.21136/CMJ.1957.100254.
- Sangiorgi, Davide (2011). "Origins of bisimulation and coinduction". In Sangiorgi, Davide; Rutten, Jan (eds.). Advanced Topics in Bisimulation and Coinduction. Cambridge University Press.
- Scott, Dana Stewart (1974). "Axiomatizing set theory". Axiomatic set theory. Proceedings of Symposia in Pure Mathematics. Vol. 13. Part II, pp. 207–214.
- Skolem, Thoralf (1923). Axiomatized set theory. Reprinted in From Frege to Gödel, van Heijenoort, 1967, in English translation by Stefan Bauer-Mengelberg, pp. 291–301.
- Suppes, Patrick (1972) [first published 1960]. Axiomatic Set Theory. Dover. ISBN 978-0-486-61630-8.
- Urquhart, Alasdair (2003). "The Theory of Types". In Griffin, Nicholas (ed.). The Cambridge Companion to Bertrand Russell. Cambridge University Press.
- Vaught, Robert L. (2001). Set Theory: An Introduction (2nd ed.). Springer. ISBN 978-0-8176-4256-3.
- von Neumann, John (1925). "Eine Axiomatisierung der Mengenlehre". Journal für die Reine und Angewandte Mathematik (in German). 154: 219–240. Translation in van Heijenoort, Jean (1967). From Frege to Gödel: A Source Book in Mathematical Logic, 1879–1931. pp. 393–413.
- von Neumann, John (1928). "Über die Definition durch transfinite Induktion und verwandte Fragen der allgemeinen Mengenlehre". Mathematische Annalen (in German). 99: 373–391. doi:10.1007/BF01459102. S2CID 120784562.
- von Neumann, John (1929). "Über eine Widerspruchfreiheitsfrage in der axiomatischen Mengenlehre". Journal für die Reine und Angewandte Mathematik (in German). 1929 (160): 227–241. doi:10.1515/crll.1929.160.227. S2CID 199545822.
- Zermelo, Ernst (1930). "Über Grenzzahlen und Mengenbereiche. Neue Untersuchungen über die Grundlagen der Mengenlehre" (PDF). Fundamenta Mathematicae (in German). 16: 29–47. doi:10.4064/fm-16-1-29-47. Archived (PDF) from the original on 2022-10-09. Translation in Ewald, W. B., ed. (1996). From Kant to Hilbert: A Source Book in the Foundations of Mathematics. Vol. 2. Clarendon Press. pp. 1219–1233.
