= Russell's paradox =

Paradox in set theory

In mathematical logic, Russell's paradox (also known as Russell's antinomy) is a set-theoretic paradox published by the British philosopher and mathematician, Bertrand Russell, in 1901. Russell's paradox shows that every set theory that contains an unrestricted comprehension principle leads to contradictions.

According to the unrestricted comprehension principle, for any sufficiently well-defined property, there is the set of all and only the objects that have that property. Let R be the set of all sets that are not members of themselves (sometimes called "the Russell set"). If R is not a member of itself, then its definition entails that it is a member of itself; yet, if it is a member of itself, then it is not a member of itself, since it is the set of all sets that are not members of themselves. The resulting contradiction is Russell's paradox. In symbols:

Let $R = \{ x \mid x \not \in x \}.$ Then $R \in R \iff R \not \in R.$

Russell also showed that a version of the paradox could be derived in the axiomatic system constructed by the German philosopher and mathematician Gottlob Frege, hence undermining Frege's attempt to reduce mathematics to logic and calling into question the logicist programme. Two influential ways of avoiding the paradox were both proposed in 1908: Russell's own type theory and the Zermelo set theory. In particular, Zermelo's axioms restricted the unlimited comprehension principle. With the additional contributions of Abraham Fraenkel, Zermelo set theory developed into the standard Zermelo–Fraenkel set theory (commonly known as ZFC when including the axiom of choice). The main difference between Russell's and Zermelo's solution to the paradox is that Zermelo modified the axioms of set theory while maintaining a standard logical language, while Russell modified the logical language itself. The language of ZFC, with the help of Thoralf Skolem, turned out to be that of first-order logic.

The paradox had already been discovered independently by the German mathematician Ernst Zermelo by 1902, and possibly as early as 1899. However, Zermelo did not publish the idea, which remained known only to David Hilbert, Edmund Husserl, and other academics at the University of Göttingen. Moreover, Zermelo did not regard the emergence of the paradoxes so much as a crisis as he believed that they could be avoided if mathematicians confine themselves to a limited number of established principles (axioms). At the end of the 1890s, Georg Cantor—considered the founder of modern set theory—had already realized that his theory would lead to a contradiction (to Cantor's theorem), as he told Hilbert and Richard Dedekind by letter. Hilbert also formulated his own paradox, which relied on reasoning similar to Cantor's diagonal argument. According to Hilbert, it even initiated Ernst Zermelo's version of Russell's paradox.

== Informal presentation ==
Most sets commonly encountered are not members of themselves. Call a set "normal" if it is not a member of itself, and "abnormal" if it is a member of itself. Clearly every set must be either normal or abnormal. For example, consider the set of all squares in a plane. This set is not itself a square in the plane, thus it is not a member of itself and is therefore normal. In contrast, the complementary set that contains everything which is not a square in the plane is itself not a square in the plane, and so it is one of its own members and is therefore abnormal.

Consider the set of all normal sets, R, and try to determine whether R is normal or abnormal. If R were normal, it would be contained in the set of all normal sets (itself), and therefore be abnormal; on the other hand if R were abnormal, it would not be contained in the set of all normal sets (itself), and therefore be normal. This leads to the conclusion that R is neither normal nor abnormal: Russell's paradox.

== Formal presentation ==
The term "naive set theory" is used in various ways. In one usage, naive set theory is a formal theory, that is formulated in a first-order language with a binary non-logical predicate $\in$, and that includes the axiom of extensionality:

$\forall x \, \forall y \, ( \forall z \, (z \in x \iff z \in y) \implies x = y)$

and the axiom schema of unrestricted comprehension:
$$\exists y \forall x (x \in y \iff \varphi(x))$$
for any predicate $\varphi$ with x as a free variable inside $\varphi$. Substitute $x \notin x$ for $\varphi(x)$ to get
$$\exists y \forall x (x \in y \iff x \notin x)$$

Then by existential instantiation (reusing the symbol $y$) and universal instantiation we have
$$y \in y \iff y \notin y ,$$
a contradiction. Therefore, this naive set theory is inconsistent.

== Philosophical implications ==
Prior to Russell's paradox (and to other similar paradoxes discovered around the time, such as the Burali-Forti paradox), a common conception of the idea of set was the "extensional concept of set", as recounted by von Neumann and Morgenstern:

A set is an arbitrary collection of objects, absolutely no restriction being placed on the nature and number of these objects, the elements of the set in question. The elements constitute and determine the set as such, without any ordering or relationship of any kind between them.

In particular, there was no distinction between sets and proper classes as collections of objects. Additionally, the existence of each of the elements of a collection was seen as sufficient for the existence of the set of said elements. However, paradoxes such as Russell's and Burali-Forti's showed the impossibility of this conception of a set, by examples of collections of objects that do not form sets, despite all said objects being existent.

== Set-theoretic responses ==
From the principle of explosion of classical logic, any proposition can be proved from a contradiction. Therefore, the presence of contradictions like Russell's paradox in an axiomatic set theory is disastrous; since if any formula can be proved true it destroys the conventional meaning of truth and falsity. Further, since set theory was seen as the basis for an axiomatic development of all other branches of mathematics, Russell's paradox threatened the foundations of mathematics as a whole. This motivated a great deal of research around the turn of the 20th century to develop a consistent (contradiction-free) set theory.

In 1908, Ernst Zermelo proposed an axiomatization of set theory that avoided the paradoxes of naive set theory by replacing arbitrary set comprehension with weaker existence axioms, such as his axiom of separation (Aussonderung). (Avoiding paradox was not Zermelo's original intention, but instead to document which assumptions he used in proving the well-ordering theorem.) Modifications to this axiomatic theory proposed in the 1920s by Abraham Fraenkel, Thoralf Skolem, and by Zermelo himself resulted in the axiomatic set theory called ZFC. This theory became widely accepted once Zermelo's axiom of choice ceased to be controversial, and ZFC has remained the canonical axiomatic set theory down to the modern day.

ZFC does not assume that, for every property, there is a set of all things satisfying that property. Rather, it asserts that given any set X, any subset of X definable using first-order logic exists. The object R defined by Russell's paradox above cannot be constructed as a subset of any set X, and is therefore not a set in ZFC. In some extensions of ZFC, like von Neumann–Bernays–Gödel set theory, objects like R are called proper classes.

ZFC is silent about types, although the cumulative hierarchy has a notion of layers that resemble types. Zermelo himself never accepted Skolem's formulation of ZFC using the language of first-order logic. As José Ferreirós notes, Zermelo insisted instead that "propositional functions (conditions or predicates) used for separating off subsets, as well as the replacement functions, can be 'entirely arbitrary' [ganz beliebig]"; the modern interpretation given to this statement is that Zermelo wanted to include higher-order quantification in order to avoid Skolem's paradox. Around 1930, Zermelo also introduced (apparently independently of von Neumann), the axiom of foundation, thus—as Ferreirós observes—"by forbidding 'circular' and 'ungrounded' sets, it [ZFC] incorporated one of the crucial motivations of TT [type theory]—the principle of the types of arguments". This 2nd order ZFC preferred by Zermelo, including axiom of foundation, allowed a rich cumulative hierarchy. Ferreirós writes that "Zermelo's 'layers' are essentially the same as the types in the contemporary versions of simple TT [type theory] offered by Gödel and Tarski. The cumulative hierarchy into which Zermelo developed his models can be described as the universe of a cumulative TT in which transfinite types are allowed. (Once an impredicative standpoint is adopted, abandoning the idea that classes are constructed, it is natural to accept transfinite types.) Thus, simple TT and ZFC could be regarded as systems that 'talk' essentially about the same intended objects. The main difference is that TT relies on a strong higher-order logic, while Zermelo employed second-order logic, and ZFC can also be given a first-order formulation. The first-order 'description' of the cumulative hierarchy is much weaker, as is shown by the existence of countable models (Skolem's paradox), but it enjoys some important advantages."

In ZFC, given a set A, it is possible to define a set B that consists of exactly the sets in A that are not members of themselves. B cannot be in A by the same reasoning in Russell's Paradox. This variation of Russell's paradox shows that no set contains everything.

Through the work of Zermelo and others, especially John von Neumann, the structure of what some see as the "natural" objects described by ZFC eventually became clear: they are the elements of the von Neumann universe, V, built up from the empty set by transfinitely iterating the power set operation. It is thus possible again to reason about sets in a non-axiomatic fashion without running afoul of Russell's paradox, namely by reasoning about the elements of V. Whether it is appropriate to think of sets in this way is a point of contention among the rival points of view on the philosophy of mathematics.

Other solutions to Russell's paradox, with an underlying strategy closer to that of type theory, include Quine's New Foundations and Scott–Potter set theory. Yet another approach is to define multiple membership relation with appropriately modified comprehension scheme, as in the Double extension set theory.

== History ==
Russell discovered the paradox in May 1901 and the paradox was contained in the May 1901 draft of Part I of Principles of Mathematics. By his own account in his 1919 Introduction to Mathematical Philosophy, he "attempted to discover some flaw in Cantor's proof that there is no greatest cardinal". In a 1902 letter, he announced the discovery to Gottlob Frege of the paradox in Frege's 1879 Begriffsschrift and framed the problem in terms of both logic and set theory, and in particular in terms of Frege's definition of function: (Note: In the following, p. 17 refers to a page in the original Begriffsschrift, and page 23 refers to the same page in van Heijenoort 1967) (Note: Remarkably, this letter was unpublished until van Heijenoort 1967—it appears with van Heijenoort's commentary at van Heijenoort 1967:124–125.)

There is just one point where I have encountered a difficulty. You state (p. 17 [p. 23 above]) that a function too, can act as the indeterminate element. This I formerly believed, but now this view seems doubtful to me because of the following contradiction. Let w be the predicate: to be a predicate that cannot be predicated of itself. Can w be predicated of itself? From each answer its opposite follows. Therefore we must conclude that w is not a predicate. Likewise there is no class (as a totality) of those classes which, each taken as a totality, do not belong to themselves. From this I conclude that under certain circumstances a definable collection [Menge] does not form a totality.

Russell would go on to cover it at length in his 1903 The Principles of Mathematics, where he repeated his first encounter with the paradox:

Before taking leave of fundamental questions, it is necessary to examine more in detail the singular contradiction, already mentioned, with regard to predicates not predicable of themselves. ... I may mention that I was led to it in the endeavour to reconcile Cantor's proof....

Russell wrote to Frege about the paradox just as Frege was preparing the second volume of his Grundgesetze der Arithmetik. Frege responded to Russell very quickly; his letter dated 22 June 1902 appeared, with van Heijenoort's commentary in Heijenoort 1967:126–127. Frege then wrote an appendix admitting to the paradox, and proposed a solution that Russell would endorse in his Principles of Mathematics, but was later considered by some to be unsatisfactory. For his part, Russell had his work at the printers and he added an appendix on the doctrine of types.

Ernst Zermelo in his (1908) A new proof of the possibility of a well-ordering (published at the same time he published "the first axiomatic set theory") laid claim to prior discovery of the antinomy in Cantor's naive set theory. He states: "And yet, even the elementary form that Russell^{9} gave to the set-theoretic antinomies could have persuaded them [J. König, Jourdain, F. Bernstein] that the solution of these difficulties is not to be sought in the surrender of well-ordering but only in a suitable restriction of the notion of set". Footnote 9 is where he stakes his claim:

^{9}1903, pp. 366–368. I had, however, discovered this antinomy myself, independently of Russell, and had communicated it prior to 1903 to Professor Hilbert among others.

Frege sent a copy of his Grundgesetze der Arithmetik to Hilbert; as noted above, Frege's last volume mentioned the paradox that Russell had communicated to Frege. After receiving Frege's last volume, on 7 November 1903, Hilbert wrote a letter to Frege in which he said, referring to Russell's paradox, "I believe Dr. Zermelo discovered it three or four years ago". A written account of Zermelo's actual argument was discovered in the Nachlass of Edmund Husserl.

In 1923, Ludwig Wittgenstein proposed to "dispose" of Russell's paradox as follows:

The reason why a function cannot be its own argument is that the sign for a function already contains the prototype of its argument, and it cannot contain itself. For let us suppose that the function F(fx) could be its own argument: in that case there would be a proposition F(F(fx)), in which the outer function F and the inner function F must have different meanings, since the inner one has the form O(fx) and the outer one has the form Y(O(fx)). Only the letter 'F' is common to the two functions, but the letter by itself signifies nothing. This immediately becomes clear if instead of F(Fu) we write (do) : F(Ou) . Ou = Fu. That disposes of Russell's paradox. (Tractatus Logico-Philosophicus, 3.333)

Russell and Alfred North Whitehead wrote their three-volume Principia Mathematica hoping to achieve what Frege had been unable to do. They sought to banish the paradoxes of naive set theory by employing a theory of types they devised for this purpose. While they succeeded in grounding arithmetic in a fashion, it is not at all evident that they did so by purely logical means. While Principia Mathematica avoided the known paradoxes and allows the derivation of a great deal of mathematics, its system gave rise to new problems.

In any case, Kurt Gödel in 1930–31 proved that while the logic of much of Principia Mathematica, later known as first-order logic, is complete, Peano arithmetic is necessarily incomplete if it is consistent. This is very widely—though not universally—regarded as having shown the logicist program of Frege to be impossible to complete.

In 2001, A Centenary International Conference celebrating the first hundred years of Russell's paradox was held in Munich and its proceedings were published.

== Applied versions ==
Some versions of this paradox are closer to real-life and may be easier to understand for non-logicians. For example, the barber paradox supposes a male barber who shaves all men who do not shave themselves and only men who do not shave themselves. When one thinks about whether the barber shaves himself or not, a similar paradox begins to emerge.

An exception may be the Grelling–Nelson paradox, in which words and meaning are the elements of the scenario rather than people and hair-cutting. Though it is easy to refute the barber's paradox by saying that such a barber does not (and cannot) exist, it is impossible to say something similar about a meaningfully defined word.

One way that the paradox has been dramatised is: suppose that every public library has to compile a catalogue of all its books. Since the catalogue is itself one of the library's books, some librarians include it in the catalogue for completeness; while others leave it out as it being one of the library's books is self evident. Next, imagine that all these catalogues are sent to the national library. Some of them include themselves in their listings, others do not. The national librarian compiles two master catalogues—one of all the catalogues that list themselves, and one of all those that do not.

The question is: should these master catalogues list themselves? The 'catalogue of all catalogues that list themselves' is no problem. If the librarian does not include it in its own listing, it remains a true catalogue of those catalogues that do include themselves. If he does include it, it remains a true catalogue of those that list themselves. However, just as the librarian cannot go wrong with the first master catalogue, he is doomed to fail with the second. When it comes to the 'catalogue of all catalogues that do not list themselves', the librarian cannot include it in its own listing, because then it would include itself, and so belong in the other catalogue, that of catalogues that do include themselves. However, if the librarian leaves it out, the catalogue is incomplete. Either way, it can never be a true master catalogue of catalogues that do not list themselves.

== Applications and related topics ==
=== Russell-like paradoxes ===
As illustrated above for the barber paradox, Russell's paradox is not hard to extend. Take:

- A transitive verb ⟨V⟩, that can be applied to its substantive form.

Form the sentence:

The ⟨V⟩er that ⟨V⟩s all (and only those) who do not ⟨V⟩ themselves,

Sometimes the "all" is replaced by "all ⟨V⟩ers".

An example would be "paint":

The painter that paints all (and only those) that do not paint themselves.

or "elect"

The elector (representative), that elects all that do not elect themselves.

Paradoxes that fall in this scheme include:

- The barber with "shave".
- The original Russell's paradox with "contain": The container (Set) that contains all (containers) that do not contain themselves.
- The Grelling–Nelson paradox with "describer": The describer (word) that describes all words, that do not describe themselves.
- Richard's paradox with "denote": The denoter (number) that denotes all denoters (numbers) that do not denote themselves. (In this paradox, all descriptions of numbers get an assigned number. The term "that denotes all denoters (numbers) that do not denote themselves" is here called Richardian.)
- "I am lying.", namely the liar paradox and Epimenides paradox, whose origins are ancient
- Russell–Myhill paradox

== Related paradoxes ==
- The Burali-Forti paradox, about the order type of all well-orderings
- Curry's paradox (named after Haskell Curry), which does not require negation
- Girard's paradox in type theory
- The Kleene–Rosser paradox, showing that the original lambda calculus is inconsistent, by means of a self-negating statement
- The smallest uninteresting integer paradox

== See also ==
- Basic Law V
- Cantor's diagonal argument – Proof in set theory
- Gödel's incompleteness theorems – Limitative results in mathematical logic
- Hilbert's first problem – Proposition in mathematical logic
- List of self–referential paradoxes
- "On Denoting"
- Paradoxes of set theory
- Quine's paradox
- Self-reference
- Strange loop – Cycles going through a hierarchy
- Universal set – Mathematical set containing all objects

== Sources ==
- Potter, Michael (15 January 2004), Set Theory and its Philosophy, Clarendon Press (Oxford University Press), ISBN 978-0-19-926973-0
- van Heijenoort, Jean (1967), From Frege to Gödel: A Source Book in Mathematical Logic, 1879–1931, (third printing 1976), Cambridge, Massachusetts: Harvard University Press, ISBN 0-674-32449-8
- Livio, Mario (6 January 2009), Is God a Mathematician?, New York: Simon & Schuster, ISBN 978-0-7432-9405-8
