= Burali-Forti paradox =

Paradox in set theory

In set theory, a field of mathematics, the Burali-Forti paradox demonstrates that constructing "the set of all ordinal numbers" leads to a contradiction and therefore shows an antinomy in a system that allows its construction. It is named after Cesare Burali-Forti, who, in 1897, published a paper proving a theorem which, unknown to him, contradicted a previously proved result by Georg Cantor. Bertrand Russell subsequently noticed the contradiction, and when he published it in his 1903 book Principles of Mathematics, he stated that it had been suggested to him by Burali-Forti's paper, with the result that it came to be known by Burali-Forti's name.

== Stated in terms of von Neumann ordinals ==
We will prove this by contradiction.

1. Let Ω be a set consisting of all ordinal numbers.
2. Ω is transitive because for every element x of Ω (which is an ordinal number and can be any ordinal number) and every element y of x (i.e. under the definition of Von Neumann ordinals, for every ordinal number y < x), we have that y is an element of Ω because any ordinal number contains only ordinal numbers, by the definition of this ordinal construction.
3. Ω is well ordered by the membership relation because all its elements are also well ordered by this relation.
4. So, by steps 2 and 3, we have that Ω is an ordinal class and also, by step 1, an ordinal number, because all ordinal classes that are sets are also ordinal numbers.
5. This implies that Ω is an element of Ω.
6. Under the definition of Von Neumann ordinals, Ω < Ω is the same as Ω being an element of Ω. This latter statement is proven by step 5.
7. But no ordinal class is less than itself, including Ω because of step 4 (Ω is an ordinal class), i.e. Ω ≮ Ω.

We have deduced two contradictory propositions (Ω < Ω and Ω ≮ Ω) from the sethood of Ω and, therefore, disproved that Ω is a set.

== Stated more generally ==
The version of the paradox above is anachronistic, because it presupposes the definition of the ordinals due to John von Neumann, under which each ordinal is the set of all preceding ordinals, which was not known at the time the paradox was framed by Burali-Forti. Here is an account with fewer presuppositions: suppose that we associate with each well-ordering an object called its order type in an unspecified way (the order types are the ordinal numbers). The order types (ordinal numbers) themselves are well-ordered in a natural way, and this well-ordering must have an order type $\Omega$. It is easily shown in naïve set theory (and remains true in ZFC but not in New Foundations) that the order type of all ordinal numbers less than a fixed $\alpha$ is $\alpha$ itself. So the order type of all ordinal numbers less than $\Omega$ is $\Omega$ itself. But this means that $\Omega$, being the order type of a proper initial segment of the ordinals, is strictly less than the order type of all the ordinals, but the latter is $\Omega$ itself by definition. This is a contradiction.

Using the von Neumann definition, under which each ordinal is identified as the set of all preceding ordinals, the paradox is unavoidable: the offending proposition that the order type of all ordinal numbers less than a fixed $\alpha$ is $\alpha$ itself must be true. The collection of von Neumann ordinals, like the collection in the Russell paradox, cannot be a set in any set theory with classical logic. But the collection of order types in New Foundations (defined as equivalence classes of well-orderings under similarity) is actually a set, and the paradox is avoided because the order type of the ordinals less than $\Omega$ turns out not to be $\Omega.$

== Resolutions of the paradox ==
Modern axioms for formal set theory such as ZF and ZFC circumvent this antinomy by not allowing the construction of sets using terms like "all sets with the property $P$", as is possible in naive set theory and as is possible with Gottlob Frege's axioms – specifically Basic Law V – in the "Grundgesetze der Arithmetik." Quine's system New Foundations (NF) uses a different solution. Rosser (1942) showed that in the original version of Quine's system "Mathematical Logic" (ML), an extension of New Foundations, it is possible to derive the Burali-Forti paradox, showing that this system was contradictory. Quine's revision of ML following Rosser's discovery does not suffer from this defect, and indeed was subsequently proved equiconsistent with NF by Hao Wang.

== See also ==
- Absolute infinite
