= Axiom of infinity =

Axiom of Zermelo-Fraenkel set theory

In axiomatic set theory and the branches of mathematics and philosophy that use it, the axiom of infinity is one of the axioms of Zermelo–Fraenkel set theory. It guarantees the existence of at least one infinite set, namely a set containing the natural numbers. It was first published by Ernst Zermelo as part of his set theory in 1908.

== Formal statement ==
Using first-order logic primitive symbols, the axiom can be expressed as follows:

$\exist \mathrm{I} \ (\exist o \ (o \in \mathrm{I} \ \land \lnot \exist n \ (n \in o)) \ \land \ \forall x \ (x \in \mathrm{I} \Rightarrow \exist y \ (y \in \mathrm{I} \ \land \ \forall a \ (a \in y \Leftrightarrow (a \in x \ \lor \ a = x))))).$

If we define $\varnothing$ to be the empty set and recognize the successor operation:

$\exists \mathrm{I} \, ( \varnothing \in \mathrm{I} \, \land \, \forall x \, (x \in \mathrm{I} \Rightarrow \, ( x \cup \{x\} ) \in \mathrm{I} ) ).$

Some mathematicians may call a set built this way an inductive set.

A natural language formulation of this axiom may read as: "There exists a set 𝐈 such that the empty set is an element of it, and for every element $x$ of 𝐈, there exists an element $y$ of 𝐈 such that the elements of $y$ consist of $x$ itself and the elements of $x$.", or in other words, "There exists an inductive set".

== Interpretation and consequences ==
This axiom is closely related to the von Neumann construction of the natural numbers in set theory, in which the successor of x is defined as x ∪ {x}. If x is a set, then it follows from the other axioms of set theory that this successor is also a uniquely defined set. Successors are used to define the usual set-theoretic encoding of the natural numbers. In this encoding, zero is the empty set:

0 = {}.

The number 1 is the successor of 0:

1 = 0 ∪ {0} = {} ∪ {0} = {0} = {{}}.

Likewise, 2 is the successor of 1:

2 = 1 ∪ {1} = {0} ∪ {1} = {0, 1} = { {}, {{}} },

and so on:

3 = {0, 1, 2} = { {}, {{}}, {{}, {{}}} };
4 = {0, 1, 2, 3} = { {}, {{}}, { {}, {{}} }, { {}, {{}}, {{}, {{}}} } }.

A consequence of this definition is that every natural number is equal to the set of all preceding natural numbers. The count of elements in each set, at the top level, is the same as the represented natural number, and the nesting depth of the most deeply nested empty set {}, including its nesting in the set that represents the number of which it is a part, is also equal to the natural number that the set represents.

This construction forms the natural numbers. However, the other axioms are insufficient to prove the existence of the set of all natural numbers, $\mathbb{N}_0$. Therefore, its existence is taken as an axiom – the axiom of infinity. This axiom asserts that there is a set I that contains 0 and is closed under the operation of taking the successor; that is, for each element of I, the successor of that element is also in I.

Thus the essence of the axiom is:

There is a set, I, that includes all the natural numbers.

The axiom of infinity is also one of the von Neumann–Bernays–Gödel axioms.

== Extracting the natural numbers from the infinite set ==
The infinite set I is a superset of the natural numbers. To show that the natural numbers themselves constitute a set, the axiom schema of specification can be applied to remove unwanted elements, leaving the set N of all natural numbers. This set is unique by the axiom of extensionality.

To extract the natural numbers, we need a definition of which sets are natural numbers. The natural numbers can be defined in a way that does not assume any axioms except the axiom of extensionality and the axiom of induction—a natural number is either zero or a successor and each of its elements is either zero or a successor of another of its elements. In formal language, the definition says:

$$\forall n (n \in \mathbf{N} \iff ([n = \empty \,\,\lor\,\, \exists k ( n = k \cup \{k\} )] \,\,\land\,\, \forall m \in n[m = \empty \,\,\lor\,\, \exists k \in n ( m = k \cup \{k\} )])).$$

Or, even more formally:

$\forall n (n \in \mathbf{N} \iff ([\forall k (\lnot k \in n) \lor \exists k \forall j (j \in n \iff (j \in k \lor j = k))] \; \land$

$$\forall m (m \in n \Rightarrow [\forall k (\lnot k \in m) \lor \exists k (k \in n \land \forall j (j \in m \iff (j \in k \lor j = k)))]))).$$

=== Alternative method ===
An alternative method is the following. Let $\Phi(x)$ be the formula that says "x is inductive"; i.e. $\Phi(x) = (\emptyset \in x \wedge \forall y(y \in x \to (y \cup \{y\} \in x)))$. Informally, what we will do is take the intersection of all inductive sets. More formally, we wish to prove the existence of a unique set $W$ such that

$\forall x(x \in W \leftrightarrow \forall I(\Phi(I) \to x \in I)).$ (*)

For existence, we will use the axiom of infinity combined with the axiom schema of specification. Let $I$ be an inductive set guaranteed by the axiom of infinity. Then we use the axiom schema of specification to define our set $W = \{x \in I:\forall J(\Phi(J) \to x \in J)\}$ – i.e. $W$ is the set of all elements of $I$, which also happen to be elements of every other inductive set. This clearly satisfies the hypothesis of (*), since if $x \in W$, then $x$ is in every inductive set, and if $x$ is in every inductive set, it is in particular in $I$, so it must also be in $W$.

For uniqueness, first note that any set that satisfies (*) is itself inductive, since 0 is in all inductive sets, and if an element $x$ is in all inductive sets, then by the inductive property so is its successor. Thus if there were another set $W'$ that satisfied (*) we would have that $W' \subseteq W$ since $W$ is inductive, and $W \subseteq W'$ since $W'$ is inductive. Thus $W = W'$. Let $\omega$ denote this unique element.

This definition is convenient because the principle of induction immediately follows: If $I \subseteq \omega$ is inductive, then also $\omega \subseteq I$, so that $I = \omega$.

Both these methods produce systems that satisfy the axioms of second-order arithmetic, since the axiom of power set allows us to quantify over the power set of $\omega$, as in second-order logic. Thus they both completely determine isomorphic systems, and since they are isomorphic under the identity map, they must in fact be equal.

== An apparently weaker version ==
Some old texts use an apparently weaker version of the axiom of infinity, to wit:

$$\exists x \, ( \exists y \, ( y \in x ) \, \land \, \forall y ( y \in x \, \rightarrow \, \exists z ( z \in x \, \land \, y \subsetneq z ) ) ) \,.$$

This says that x is non-empty and for every element y of x there is another element z of x such that y is a subset of z and y is not equal to z. This implies that x is an infinite set without saying much about its structure. However, with the help of the other axioms of ZF, we can show that this implies the existence of ω. First, if we take the powerset of any infinite set x, then that powerset will contain elements that are subsets of x of every finite cardinality (among other subsets of x). Proving the existence of those finite subsets may require either the axiom of separation or the axioms of pairing and union. Then we can apply the axiom of replacement to replace each element of that powerset of x by the initial ordinal number of the same cardinality (or zero, if there is no such ordinal). The result will be an infinite set of ordinals. Then we can apply the axiom of union to that to get an ordinal greater than or equal to ω.

== Independence ==
The axiom of infinity cannot be proved from the other axioms of ZFC if they are consistent. (To see why, note that ZFC implies the consistency of ZFC − Infinity and use Gödel's second incompleteness theorem.)

The negation of the axiom of infinity cannot be derived from the rest of the axioms of ZFC, if they are consistent. (This is tantamount to saying that ZFC is consistent, if the other axioms are consistent.) Thus, ZFC implies neither the axiom of infinity nor its negation and is compatible with either.

Indeed, using the von Neumann hierarchy, we can build a model of ZFC − Infinity + (¬Infinity). It is $V_\omega \!$, the class of hereditarily finite sets, with the inherited membership relation. Note that if the axiom of the empty set is not taken as a part of this system (since it can be derived from ZF – Empty), then the empty domain also satisfies ZFC − Infinity + ¬Infinity, as all of its axioms are universally quantified, and thus trivially satisfied if no set exists.

The cardinality of the set of natural numbers, aleph null ($\aleph_0$), has many of the properties of a large cardinal. Thus the axiom of infinity is sometimes regarded as the first large cardinal axiom, and conversely large cardinal axioms are sometimes called stronger axioms of infinity.

== See also ==
- Finitism
- Peano axioms
