= Maximum-minimums identity =

Relates the maximum element of a set of numbers and the minima of its non-empty subsets

In mathematics, the maximum-minimums identity is a relation between the maximum element of a set S of n numbers and the minima of the 2^{n} − 1 non-empty subsets of S.

Let S = {x_{1}, x_{2}, ..., x_{n}}. The identity states that

$$\begin{align}
\max\{x_1,x_2,\ldots,x_{n}\}
& = \sum_{i=1}^n x_i - \sum_{i<j}\min\{x_i,x_j\} +\sum_{i<j<k}\min\{x_i,x_j,x_k\} - \cdots \\
& \qquad \cdots + \left(-1\right)^{n+1}\min\{x_1,x_2,\ldots,x_n\},\end{align}$$

or conversely

$$\begin{align}
\min\{x_1,x_2,\ldots,x_{n}\}
& = \sum_{i=1}^n x_i - \sum_{i<j}\max\{x_i,x_j\} +\sum_{i<j<k}\max\{x_i,x_j,x_k\} - \cdots \\
& \qquad \cdots + \left(-1\right)^{n+1}\max\{x_1,x_2,\ldots,x_n\}.
\end{align}$$

For a probabilistic proof, see the reference.

== See also ==
- Inclusion–exclusion principle
- Maxima and minima § In relation to sets
