= Daniel da Silva (mathematician) =

Portuguese mathematician and marine officer (1814–1878)

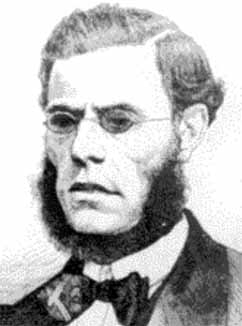
- Daniel Augusto da Silva
- Born: Daniel Augusto da Silva; 16 May 1814; Lisbon
- Died: 6 October 1878 (aged 64); Oeiras
- Education: Portugal's Naval School, Coimbra University
- Scientific career
- Fields: Mathematics and physics
- Workplaces: Portugal's Naval School

Daniel da Silva (16 May 1814 – 6 October 1878) was a Portuguese mathematician and marine officer. Born in Lisbon, he completed his first studies at the Portuguese Naval School, and then proceeded his education in Mathematics at the University of Coimbra where he became a doctor.

He was a pioneer in the development of theory of couple in classical mechanics and in actuarial science.

== Bibliography ==
Daniel Augusto da Silva was born in Lisbon on 16 May 1814. At the age of 15, he enrolled in Portugal's Naval School, where he took courses on Mathematics and Physics. In 1832 he entered in Portugal's Royal Academy of Marine Guards, and was appointed Navy Officer in 1833. After finishing his degree in the Naval School in 1835, he enrolled in the Mathematics Faculty of University of Coimbra. In 1839, he concluded his bachelor's degree.

After finishing his studies in Coimbra, Daniel da Silva returned to Lisbon to follow a career in the navy. In 1845, the Portugal's Royal Academy of Marine Guards was transformed in the Naval School, and da Silva was appointed as a substitute teacher there. In 1848, he became Full Professor of the Naval School.

== Contributions to Mathematics ==
The inclusion–exclusion principle was stated and proved for the first time by Daniel da Silva in his memoir Propriedades geraes e resolução das congruências binomias: Introducção ao estudo da theoria dos numeros (General properties and direct resolution of binomial congruences), presented to the Lisbon Academy of Sciences in 1852 and published in 1854.

In this memory, Daniel da Silva also proved the following generalisation of Euler's theorem: let $n = a_1 a_2 \ldots a_k$ be an integer number where a_{1}, ... , a_{k} are pairwise coprime. Then

$a_1^{\phi(n/a_1)} + a_2^{\phi(n/a_2)} + \cdots + a_k^{\phi(n/a_k)} \equiv k-1 \quad (\text{mod} \, n)$

where $\phi$ denotes the Euler's totient function.

Another important publication of Daniel da Silva is Memória sobre a rotação das forças em torno dos pontos de aplicação (Memoir on the rotation of forces about their points of application) on classical mechanics, presented in 1850 to Lisbon Academy of Sciences. In this work, Daniel da Silva worked on the problem of the equilibrium of a system of forces turning around their points of application, but maintaining their relative angles while rotating. He worked on this problem without knowledge of the results of August Ferdinand Möbius on this problem, and many of the results present in Daniel da Silva's memoir anticipated Jean Gaston Darboux results on Statics, including a correction of a Möbius mistake.

== Main publications ==
- 1850 - Memória sobre a rotação das forças em torno dos pontos de aplicação, Comunicações da Academia Real das Sciencias de Lisboa, 1.ª Classe.
- 1854 - Propriedades geraes e resolução das congruências binomias: Introducção ao estudo da theoria dos numeros, Memórias da Academia Real das Sciencias de Lisboa, 1.ª Classe.
