= Method of distinguished element =

Method in enumerative combinatorics

In the mathematical field of enumerative combinatorics, identities are sometimes established by arguments that rely on singling out one "distinguished element" of a set.

== Definition ==
Let $\mathcal{A}$ be a family of subsets of the set $A$ and let $x \in A$ be a distinguished element of set $A$. Then suppose there is a predicate $P(X,x)$ that relates a subset $X\subseteq A$ to $x$. Denote $\mathcal{A}(x)$ to be the set of subsets $X$ from $\mathcal{A}$ for which $P(X,x)$ is true and $\mathcal{A}-x$ to be the set of subsets $X$ from $\mathcal{A}$ for which $P(X,x)$ is false, Then $\mathcal{A}(x)$ and $\mathcal{A}-x$ are disjoint sets, so by the method of summation, the cardinalities are additive

$$|\mathcal{A}| = |\mathcal{A}(x)| + |\mathcal{A}-x|$$

Thus the distinguished element allows for a decomposition according to a predicate that is a simple form of a divide and conquer algorithm. In combinatorics, this allows for the construction of recurrence relations. Examples are in the next section.

== Examples ==
- The binomial coefficient ${n \choose k}$ is the number of size-k subsets of a size-n set. A basic identity—one of whose consequences is that the binomial coefficients are precisely the numbers appearing in Pascal's triangle—states that:

$${n \choose k-1}+{n \choose k}={n+1 \choose k}.$$

Proof: In a size-(n + 1) set, choose one distinguished element. The set of all size-k subsets contains: (1) all size-k subsets that do contain the distinguished element, and (2) all size-k subsets that do not contain the distinguished element. If a size-k subset of a size-(n + 1) set does contain the distinguished element, then its other k − 1 elements are chosen from among the other n elements of our size-(n + 1) set. The number of ways to choose those is therefore ${n \choose k-1}$. If a size-k subset does not contain the distinguished element, then all of its k members are chosen from among the other n "non-distinguished" elements. The number of ways to choose those is therefore ${n \choose k}$.

- The number of subsets of any size-n set is 2^{n}.

Proof: We use mathematical induction. The basis for induction is the truth of this proposition in case n = 0. The empty set has 0 members and 1 subset, and 2^{0} = 1. The induction hypothesis is the proposition in case n; we use it to prove case n + 1. In a size-(n + 1) set, choose a distinguished element. Each subset either contains the distinguished element or does not. If a subset contains the distinguished element, then its remaining elements are chosen from among the other n elements. By the induction hypothesis, the number of ways to do that is 2^{n}. If a subset does not contain the distinguished element, then it is a subset of the set of all non-distinguished elements. By the induction hypothesis, the number of such subsets is 2^{n}. Finally, the whole list of subsets of our size-(n + 1) set contains 2^{n} + 2^{n} = 2^{n+1} elements.

- Let B_{n} be the nth Bell number, i.e., the number of partitions of a set of n members. Let C_{n} be the total number of "parts" (or "blocks", as combinatorialists often call them) among all partitions of that set. For example, the partitions of the size-3 set {a, b, c} may be written thus:

$$\begin{matrix}abc \\  a/bc \\  b/ac \\  c/ab \\  a/b/c \end{matrix}$$

We see 5 partitions, containing 10 blocks, so B_{3} = 5 and C_{3} = 10. An identity states:

$$B_n+C_n=B_{n+1}.$$

Proof: In a size-(n + 1) set, choose a distinguished element. In each partition of our size-(n + 1) set, either the distinguished element is a "singleton", i.e., the set containing only the distinguished element is one of the blocks, or the distinguished element belongs to a larger block. If the distinguished element is a singleton, then deletion of the distinguished element leaves a partition of the set containing the n non-distinguished elements. There are B_{n} ways to do that. If the distinguished element belongs to a larger block, then its deletion leaves a block in a partition of the set containing the n non-distinguished elements. There are C_{n} such blocks.

== See also ==
- Combinatorial principles
- Combinatorial proof
