= Algebraic enumeration =

Algebraic enumeration is a subfield of enumeration that deals with finding exact formulas for the number of combinatorial objects of a given type, rather than estimating this number asymptotically. Methods of finding these formulas include generating functions and the solution of recurrence relations. The field involves bijections, power series and formal Laurent series.
