= Set-theoretic definition of natural numbers =

Axiom(s) of Set Theory

In set theory, several ways have been proposed to construct the natural numbers. These include the representation via von Neumann ordinals, commonly employed in axiomatic set theory, and a system based on equinumerosity that was proposed by Gottlob Frege and by Bertrand Russell.

== Definition as von Neumann ordinals ==
In Zermelo–Fraenkel (ZF) set theory, the natural numbers are defined recursively by letting 0 = {} be the empty set and n + 1 (the successor function) = n ∪ {n} for each n. In this way n = {0, 1, …, n − 1} for each natural number n. This definition has the property that n is a set with n elements. The first few numbers defined this way are: (Goldrei 1996)

$$\begin{alignat}{2}
0 & {} = \{\}      && {} = \varnothing,\\
1 & {} = \{0\}     && {} = \{\varnothing\},\\
2 & {} = \{0,1\}   && {} = \{\varnothing,\{\varnothing\}\},\\
3 & {} = \{0,1,2\} && {} = \{\varnothing,\{\varnothing\},\{\varnothing,\{\varnothing\}\}\}.
\end{alignat}$$

The set N of natural numbers is defined in this system as the smallest set containing 0 and closed under the successor function S defined by S(n) = n ∪ {n}. The structure ⟨N, 0, S⟩ is a model of the Peano axioms (Goldrei 1996). The existence of the set N is equivalent to the axiom of infinity in ZF set theory.

The set N and its elements, when constructed this way, are an initial part of the von Neumann ordinals. W. V. O. Quine refers to these sets as "counter sets".

== Frege and Russell ==
Gottlob Frege and Bertrand Russell each proposed defining a natural number n as the collection of all sets with n elements. More formally, a natural number is an equivalence class of finite sets under the equivalence relation of equinumerosity. This definition may appear circular, but it is not, because equinumerosity can be defined in alternate ways, for instance by saying that two sets are equinumerous if they can be put into one-to-one correspondence—this is sometimes known as Hume's principle.

This definition works in type theory, and in set theories that grew out of type theory, such as New Foundations and related systems. However, it does not work in the axiomatic set theory ZFC nor in certain related systems, because in such systems the equivalence classes under equinumerosity are proper classes rather than sets. However, cardinals can be defined in ZF using Scott's trick.

For enabling natural numbers to form a set, equinumerous classes are replaced by special sets, named cardinal. The simplest way to introduce cardinals is to add a primitive notion, Card(), and an axiom of cardinality to ZF set theory (without axiom of choice).

Axiom of cardinality: The sets A and B are equinumerous if and only if Card(A) = Card(B)

Definition: the sum of cardinals K and L such as K= Card(A) and L = Card(B) where the sets A and B are disjoint, is Card (A ∪ B).

The definition of a finite set is given independently of natural numbers:

Definition: A set is finite if and only if any non empty family of its subsets has a minimal element for the inclusion order.

Definition: a cardinal n is a natural number if and only if there exists a finite set of which the cardinal is n.

0 = Card (∅)

1 = Card({A}) = Card({∅})

Definition: the successor of a cardinal K is the cardinal K + 1

Theorem: the natural numbers satisfy Peano’s axioms

== Hatcher ==
William S. Hatcher (1982) derives Peano's axioms from several foundational systems, including ZFC and category theory, and from the system of Frege's Grundgesetze der Arithmetik using modern notation and natural deduction. The Russell paradox proved this system inconsistent, but George Boolos (1998) and David J. Anderson and Edward Zalta (2004) show how to repair it.

== See also ==
- Ackermann coding
- Foundations of mathematics
- New Foundations
- Implementation of mathematics in set theory

== Bibliography ==
- Anderson, D. J., and Edward Zalta, 2004, "Frege, Boolos, and Logical Objects," Journal of Philosophical Logic 33: 1–26.
- George Boolos, 1998. Logic, Logic, and Logic.
- Goldrei, Derek (1996). Classic Set Theory. Chapman & Hall.
- Fraenkel, Abraham (1968) [1953]. Abstract Set Theory (4th ed.). Amsterdam: North Holland.
- Hatcher, William S., 1982. The Logical Foundations of Mathematics. Pergamon. In this text, S refers to the Peano axioms.
- Holmes, Randall, 1998. Elementary Set Theory with a Universal Set. Academia-Bruylant. The publisher has graciously consented to permit diffusion of this introduction to NFU via the web. Copyright is reserved.
- Suppes, Patrick (1972) [1960]. Axiomatic Set Theory. Dover.
