= Natural number =

Number used for counting

Natural numbers can be used for counting: one apple; then two apples; then three apples.

In mathematics, the natural numbers are the numbers 0, 1, 2, 3, and so on, possibly excluding 0. (Note: It depends on authors and context whether 0 is considered a natural number.) The terms positive integers, non-negative integers, whole numbers, and counting numbers are also used. The set of the natural numbers is commonly denoted by a bold N or a blackboard bold $\N$.

The natural numbers are used for counting, and for labeling the result of a count, such as: "there are seven days in a week", in which case they are called cardinal numbers. They are also used to label places in an ordered series, such as: "the third day of the month", in which case they are called ordinal numbers.

Natural numbers are commonly expressed in writing using ten symbols called digits (0, 1, 2, 3, 4, 5, 6, 7, 8, 9). These expressions, called numerals, can also be used as unique identifiers or labels (like the jersey numbers of a sports team) that are referred to as nominal numbers, which resemble natural numbers but have no specific mathematical properties.

Any pair of natural numbers can be compared by size: the number which appears later in counting order is greater than the other. Two basic operations are defined on natural numbers: addition and multiplication. Their inverse operations, subtraction and division, only sometimes give natural-number results: subtracting a larger natural number from a smaller one results in a negative number and dividing one natural number by another commonly leaves a remainder, in which case the result of the division is a fraction.

The most common number systems used throughout mathematics – the integers, rational numbers, real numbers, and complex numbers – contain the natural numbers, and are defined successively, one from the other, starting from the natural numbers.

Arithmetic is the study of the ways to perform basic operations on these number systems. Number theory is the study of the properties of these operations and their generalizations. Much of combinatorics involves counting mathematical objects, patterns and structures that are defined using natural numbers.

== Intuitive concept ==
Natural numbers are used for counting, ordering, and the four basic operations of arithmetic: addition, subtraction, multiplication, and division. An intuitive and implicit understanding of natural numbers is developed naturally through using numbers. Within this are two closely related aspects of what a natural number is: the size of a collection; and a position in a sequence. The difference between these concepts becomes significant in the study of transfinite numbers.

=== Counting and collection size ===
The cardinality principle of counting

Counting is the process of iterating through the natural numbers in sequential order starting at 1. It can be done using numbers alone (as in "counting to 10"), but more often is used to answer questions like "how many apples are on the table?" by applying the count to objects (as in "counting the students in the class"). This involves consecutively "tagging" each object with a number while maintaining a running partition of the tagged objects from those not yet tagged. The numbers must be assigned in order starting at 1 – so they are ordinal numbers – but the order of the objects chosen is arbitrary, as long as each object receives one and only one number. The cardinality principle is the theorem that the ordinal number assigned to the final object does not depends on the order chosen for the objects, and gives the result of the count: the cardinal number of the collection.

A group of apples and group of oranges with the same cardinality

When applied to a collection of objects, counting determines the cardinality of the collection by establishing a one-to-one correspondence between the objects and a sequence of natural numbers. This characteristic, the size of a collection, is called cardinality and a natural number used to describe or measure it is a cardinal number. Two finite collections have the same size or cardinality if they can be put in a one-to-one correspondence, meaning the objects can be arranged in pairs (one from each collection), with every object in exactly one pair. In the adjacent image every apple is paired with exactly one orange and every orange is paired with exactly one apple. As such, the group of apples has the same cardinality as the group of oranges, or put more simply the number of apples is the same as the number of oranges.

Because this equality can be established without counting or using any prior notion of number, it can form the definition of a cardinal number. In this case, the number of apples, oranges – and of any other collection that could be paired off to either group – is 3.

If two collections do not have the same cardinality, pairing will leave one of the collections with objects that are unpaired and this can be used to define a size relationship between them. The collection in which all objects are paired is said to be "smaller" and the one left with unpaired objects "larger", than the other.

=== Position in a sequence ===
A sequence is a list of objects in a specific order. More precisely, a sequence is a function that assigns an object to each position in that list. The positions themselves are labeled using a well-ordered set; every element always has a clear next element. Every well-ordered set has an order type, which is the ordinal number that describes its shape of ordering. The position labels here are not counts or size like with the cardinal numbers, just ordered elements.

The natural numbers are the most common choice for labeling infinite sequences because they form the simplest infinite well-ordered set, with order type ω. They start at either 0 or 1 and continue in their familiar fixed order – 1, 2, 3, and so on – with no end point. Each natural number labels a specific position in the sequence based on where it falls relative to all other positions. For example, 1 is the first position, 2 is the position right after 1, and 3 is the position after both 1 and 2 and before 4, 5, and so on. This ordering matches the usual ordering, smaller numbers before larger ones. But the natural numbers are simply the most familiar example; any well-ordered set would work equally well for indexing a sequence, for example the set of letters a, b, c, and so on.

== Terminology and notation ==
The term natural numbers has two common definitions: either 0, 1, 2, ... or 1, 2, 3, .... Because there is no universal convention, the definition can be chosen to suit the context of use. To eliminate ambiguity, the sequences 1, 2, 3, ... and 0, 1, 2, ... are often called the positive integers and the non-negative integers, respectively.

The phrase whole numbers is frequently used for the natural numbers that include 0, although it may also mean all integers, positive and negative. In primary education, counting numbers usually refer to the natural numbers starting at 1, though this definition can vary.

The set of all natural numbers is typically denoted N or in blackboard bold as $\mathbb N$. (Note: Older texts have occasionally employed J as the symbol for this set.) Whether 0 is included is often determined by the context but may also be specified by using $\mathbb N$ or $\mathbb Z$ (the set of all integers) with a subscript or superscript. Examples include $\mathbb{N}_1$, or $\mathbb Z^+$ (for the set starting at 1) and $\mathbb{N}_0$ or $\mathbb Z^{0+}$ (for the set including 0).

=== Numeral ===
A numeral is a symbol or grouping of symbols used to express a natural number in writing, and a particular set of symbols with specific rules for using them is a numeral system. Each symbol in a numeral system represents a unique natural number - said to be its value - and can be used alone as a numeral, or in a string with other symbols which together form a numeral.

The decimal system which uses Arabic numerals and positional notation rules is the universal standard for representing natural numbers in mathematics and in common use. In part because of this universal standard, the distinction between an abstract number (a value) and its symbol (a numeral) is generally unimportant so numerals are frequently referred to simply as "numbers". This is sometimes done even where the distinction is relevant, as with binary numerals which are often called "binary numbers".

== Formal definitions ==
Formal definitions take the existing, intuitive notion of natural numbers together with the rules of arithmetic and define them both in the more fundamental terms of mathematical logic. Formal systems typically assume that the defining characteristic of natural numbers is their fixed order and establish this order using the primitive notion of a successor. Every natural number has a successor, which is another unique natural number that it is followed by.

Two standard formal definitions are based on the Peano axioms and set theory. The Peano axioms (named for Giuseppe Peano) do not explicitly define what the natural numbers are, but instead comprise a list of statements or axioms that must be true of natural numbers, however they are defined. In contrast, set theory defines each natural number as a particular set, in which a set can be generally understood as a collection of distinct objects or elements. While the two methods are different, they are consistent in that the natural number sets collectively satisfy the Peano axioms.

=== Peano axioms ===
The five Peano axioms are: (Note: Hamilton (1988), pp. 117 ff calls them "Peano's Postulates" and begins with "1. 0 is a natural number." Halmos (1966), p. 46 uses the language of set theory instead of the language of arithmetic for his five axioms. He begins with "(I) 0 ∈ ω (where, of course, 0 = ∅" (ω is the set of all natural numbers). Morash (1991), Section 10.1: An Axiomatization for the System of Positive Integers gives "a two-part axiom" in which the natural numbers begin with 1.)

1. 0 is a natural number.
2. Every natural number has a successor which is also a natural number.
3. 0 is not the successor of any natural number.
4. If the successor of x equals the successor of y, then x equals y.
5. The axiom of induction: If a statement is true of 0, and if the truth of that statement for a number implies its truth for the successor of that number, then the statement is true for every natural number.

These are not the original axioms published by Peano, but are named in his honor. Some forms of the Peano axioms have 1 in place of 0. In ordinary arithmetic, the successor of x is x + 1.

=== Set-theoretic definition ===
In set theory each natural number n is defined as a specific set. A variety of constructions have been proposed, however the standard solution (due to John von Neumann) is:

- Call 0 = { }, the empty set.
- Define the successor S(a) of any set a by S(a) = a ∪ {a}.
- By the axiom of infinity, there exist sets which contain 0 and are closed under the successor function. Such sets are said to be inductive. The intersection of all inductive sets is still an inductive set.
- This intersection is the set of the natural numbers.

This produces an iterative definition of the natural numbers called the von Neumann ordinals:
$$\begin{alignat}{2}
0 &  && {} = \{\ \}             &&     {} = \varnothing \\
1 & = 0 \cup \{0\} && {} = \{0\}   && = \{ \varnothing\} \\
2 & = 1 \cup \{1\} && {} = \{0,1\} && {}  = \{\varnothing,\{\varnothing\}\}\\
3 & = 2 \cup \{2\} && {} = \{0,1,2\} && {} = \{\varnothing,\{\varnothing\},\{\varnothing,\{\varnothing\}\}\} \\
n & = n-1 \cup \{n-1\} && {} = \{0,1, ...,n-1\} && {} = \{\varnothing,\{\varnothing\},...,\{\varnothing,\{\varnothing\},...\}\}\\
\end{alignat}$$

In this construction every natural number n is a set containing n elements, where each element is a natural number less than n. From this, the intuitive concepts of cardinality and order can be formally defined as:

- Cardinality: a set S has n elements if there is a one-to-one correspondence or bijection from n to S.
- Order: n ≤ m if and only if n is a subset of m.

Another construction sometimes called Zermelo ordinals defines 0 = { } and S(a) = {a} and is now largely only of historical interest.

== Properties ==
This section uses the convention that 0 is a natural number: $\mathbb{N}=\mathbb{N}_0$.

=== Addition ===
Given the set $\mathbb{N}$ of natural numbers and the successor function $S \colon \mathbb{N} \to \mathbb{N}$ sending each natural number to the next one, addition ($+$) is defined by:
$$\begin{align}
a + 0    & = a          & \textrm{(1)}\\
a + S(b) & = S(a+b)     & \textrm{(2)}\\
\end{align}$$
In the statements above, (1) explicitly defines addition for the first natural number and (2) gives a recursive definition for each subsequent number in terms of previous definitions, as illustrated below.
$$\begin{alignat}{2}
& a + 1 = a + S(0) = S(a+0) = S(a) \\
& a + 2 = a + S(1) = S(a+1) = S(S(a)) \\
& a + 3 = a + S(2) = S(a+2) = S(S(S(a)))
\end{alignat}$$
In this way, addition can be seen as repeated application of the successor function. Intuitively, $a + b$ is evaluated by applying the successor function to $a$ as many times as it must be applied to $0$ to produce $b$.

The algebraic structure $(\mathbb{N}, +)$ is a commutative monoid with identity element $0$. It is a free monoid on one generator. This commutative monoid satisfies the cancellation property, so it can be embedded in a group. The smallest group containing the natural numbers is the integers.

=== Multiplication ===
Analogously, given that addition has been defined, a multiplication operator $\times$ can be defined via a × 0 = 0 and a × S(b) = (a × b) + a. This turns $(\mathbb{N}^*, \times)$ into a free commutative monoid with identity element 1; a generator set for this monoid is the set of prime numbers.

=== Relationship between addition and multiplication ===
In the natural numbers, addition and multiplication are compatible, which is expressed in the distribution law: a × (b + c) = (a × b) + (a × c). However $\mathbb{N}$ is not closed under subtraction (that is, subtracting one natural from another does not always result in another natural); equivalently, one can say that $\mathbb{N}$ lacks additive inverses. These properties of addition and multiplication mean that $\mathbb{N}$ is not a ring; instead it is a semiring (also known as a rig). Semirings are an algebraic generalization of rings where multiplication is not necessarily commutative, although multiplication in $\mathbb{N}$ is commutative.

If the natural numbers are taken as "excluding 0", and "starting at 1", the definitions of + and × are as above, except that they begin with a + 1 = S(a) and a × 1 = a. Furthermore, $(\mathbb{N^*}, +)$ has no identity element.

=== Order ===
A total order on the natural numbers is defined by letting a ≤ b if and only if there exists another natural number c where a + c = b. This order is compatible with the arithmetical operations in the following sense: if a, b and c are natural numbers and a ≤ b, then a + c ≤ b + c and a × c ≤ b × c.

An important property of the natural numbers is that they are well-ordered: every non-empty set of natural numbers has a least element. The rank among well-ordered sets is expressed by an ordinal number; for the natural numbers, this is denoted as ω (omega).

=== Division ===
While it is in general not possible to divide one natural number by another and get a natural number as result, the procedure of division with remainder or Euclidean division is available as a substitute: for any two natural numbers a and b with b ≠ 0 there are natural numbers q and r such that
$$a = b \times q + r \text{ and } r < b.$$

The number q is called the quotient and r is called the remainder of the division of a by b. The numbers q and r are uniquely determined by a and b. This Euclidean division is key to the several other properties (divisibility), algorithms (such as the Euclidean algorithm), and ideas in number theory.

=== Algebraic properties satisfied by the natural numbers ===
The addition (+) and multiplication (×) operations on natural numbers as defined above have several algebraic properties:

- Closure under addition and multiplication: for all natural numbers a and b, both a + b and a × b are natural numbers.
- Associativity: for all natural numbers a, b, and c, a + (b + c) = (a + b) + c and a × (b × c) = (a × b) × c.
- Commutativity: for all natural numbers a and b, a + b = b + a and a × b = b × a.
- Existence of identity elements: for every natural number a, a + 0 = a and a × 1 = a.
  - If the natural numbers are taken as "excluding 0", and "starting at 1", then for every natural number a, a × 1 = a. However, the "existence of additive identity element" property is not satisfied
- Distributivity of multiplication over addition for all natural numbers a, b, and c, a × (b + c) = (a × b) + (a × c).
- No nonzero zero divisors: if a and b are natural numbers such that a × b = 0, then a = 0 or b = 0 (or both).

== History ==
For most of history, what are now called natural numbers were simply numbers. Between the late middle ages and end of the 17th century, the concept of number expanded to include negative, rational and irrational numbers, becoming what we now call the real numbers. With this came the need to distinguish between the original numbers and these new types.

Nicolas Chuquet used the term progression naturelle 'natural progression' in 1484. The earliest known use of "natural number" as a complete English phrase is in 1763. The 1771 Encyclopaedia Britannica defines natural numbers in the logarithm article.

=== Zero as natural number ===
Starting at 0 or 1 has long been a matter of convention. In 1727, Bernard Le Bovier de Fontenelle argued both ways, that 0 could be a term as in a sequence 0, 1, 2, ..., but that 1 was a basic element out of which other numbers could be formed by repeated addition. In 1889, Giuseppe Peano used 'N' for the positive integers and started at 1, but he later changed to using N_{0} and N_{1}. Most early authors excluded 0, but many mathematicians such as George A. Wentworth, Bertrand Russell, Nicolas Bourbaki, Paul Halmos, Stephen Cole Kleene, and John Horton Conway included 0. Including 0 gained wider adoption in the 1960s and was formalized in ISO 31-11 (1978), which defines natural numbers to include 0, a convention retained in the current ISO 80000-2 standard.

=== Formal construction ===
In 19th century Europe, there was mathematical and philosophical discussion about the exact nature of the natural numbers. Henri Poincaré stated that axioms can only be demonstrated in their finite application, and concluded that it is "the power of the mind" which allows conceiving of the indefinite repetition of the same act. Leopold Kronecker summarized his belief as "God made the integers, all else is the work of man". (Note: The English translation is from Gray. In a footnote, Gray attributes the German quote to: "Weber 1891–1892, 19, quoting from a lecture of Kronecker's of 1886.")

The constructivists saw a need to improve upon the logical rigor in the foundations of mathematics. (Note: Eves (1990), p. 606: "Much of the mathematical work of the twentieth century has been devoted to examining the logical foundations and structure of the subject.") In the 1860s, Hermann Grassmann suggested a recursive definition for natural numbers, thus stating they were not really natural—but a consequence of definitions. Later, two classes of such formal definitions emerged, using set theory and Peano's axioms respectively. Later still, they were shown to be equivalent in most practical applications.

Set-theoretical definitions of natural numbers were initiated by Frege. He initially defined a natural number as the class of all sets that are in one-to-one correspondence with a particular set. However, this definition turned out to lead to paradoxes, including Russell's paradox. To avoid such paradoxes, the formalism was modified so that a natural number is defined as a particular set, and any set that can be put into one-to-one correspondence with that set is said to have that number of elements.

In 1881, Charles Sanders Peirce provided the first axiomatization of natural-number arithmetic. In 1888, Richard Dedekind proposed another axiomatization of natural-number arithmetic, and in 1889, Giuseppe Peano published a simplified version of Dedekind's axioms in his book The principles of arithmetic presented by a new method (Latin: Arithmetices principia, nova methodo exposita). This approach is now called Peano arithmetic. It is based on an axiomatization of the properties of ordinal numbers: each natural number has a successor and every non-zero natural number has a unique predecessor. Peano arithmetic is equiconsistent with several weak systems of set theory. One such system is ZFC with the axiom of infinity replaced by its negation. Theorems that can be proved in ZFC but cannot be proved using the Peano Axioms include Goodstein's theorem.

== Generalizations ==
Set inclusions between the natural numbers ($\mathbb{N}$), the integers ($\mathbb{Z}$), the rational numbers ($\mathbb{Q}$), the real numbers ($\mathbb{R}$), and the complex numbers ($\mathbb{C}$)

The most common number systems used throughout mathematics are extensions of the natural numbers, in the sense that each of them contains a subset which has the same arithmetical structure. These number systems can also be formally defined in terms of natural numbers (though they need not be). (Note: The commonly-assumed set-theoretic containment may be obtained by constructing the reals, discarding any earlier constructions, and defining the other sets as subsets of the final construction.) If the difference of every two natural numbers is considered to be a number, the result is the integers, which include zero and negative numbers. If the quotient of every two integers is considered to be a number, the result is the rational numbers, including fractions. If every infinite decimal is considered to be a number, the result is the real numbers. If every solution of a polynomial equation is considered to be a number, the result is the complex numbers.

Other generalizations of natural numbers are discussed in Number § Extensions of the concept.

== See also ==
- Canonical representation of a positive integer – Representation of a number as a product of primes
- Countable set – Mathematical set that can be enumerated
- Sequence – Function of the natural numbers in another set
- Ordinal number – Generalization of "n-th" to infinite cases
- Cardinal number – Size of a possibly infinite set
- Set-theoretic definition of natural numbers – Axiom(s) of Set Theory

== Bibliography ==
- Benacerraf, Paul (January 1965). "What Numbers Could not Be". The Philosophical Review. 74: 47–73. JSTOR 2183530.
- Bluman, Allan (2010). Pre-Algebra DeMYSTiFieD (2nd ed.). McGraw-Hill Professional. ISBN 978-0-07-174251-1.
- Carothers, N. L. (2000). Real Analysis. Cambridge University Press. ISBN 978-0-521-49756-5.
- Carey, Susan (2009). The Origin of Concepts. Oxford University Press. ISBN 978-0-19-536763-8.
- Clapham, Christopher; Nicholson, James (2014). The Concise Oxford Dictionary of Mathematics (5th ed.). Oxford University Press. ISBN 978-0-19-967959-1.
- Dedekind, Richard (1901). Essays on the Theory of Numbers. Translated by Beman, Wooster Woodruff. Chicago: Open Court.
- Eves, Howard (1990). An Introduction to the History of Mathematics (6th ed.). Thomson. ISBN 978-0-03-029558-4.
- Gelman, Rochel; Gallistel, C. R. (1986). The Child's Understanding of Number. Harvard University Press. ISBN 0-674-11637-2.
- Halmos, Paul (1966). Naive Set Theory. Princeton: Van Nostrand. LCCN 60-11059.
- Hamilton, A. G. (1988). Logic for Mathematicians (Revised ed.). Cambridge University Press. ISBN 978-0-521-36865-0.
- James, Robert C.; James, Glenn (1992). Mathematics Dictionary (Fifth ed.). Chapman & Hall. ISBN 978-0-412-99041-0.
- Landau, Edmund (1966). Foundations of Analysis (3rd ed.). Chelsea Publishing. ISBN 978-0-8218-2693-5.
- Levy, Azriel (1979). Basic Set Theory. Springer-Verlag Berlin Heidelberg. ISBN 978-3-662-02310-5.
- Mac Lane, Saunders; Birkhoff, Garrett (1988). Algebra (3rd ed.). New York: Chelsea. ISBN 978-0-8218-1646-2.
- Mayberry, John P. (2000). The foundations of mathematics in the theory of sets. Cambridge University Press. ISBN 978-0-521-17271-4.
- Mendelson, Elliott (1985) [1973]. Number Systems and the Foundations of Analysis (Reprint ed.). Malabar, FL: R. E. Krieger. ISBN 0-89874-818-6.
- Morash, Ronald P. (1991). Bridge to Abstract Mathematics: Mathematical proof and structures (2nd ed.). Mcgraw-Hill. ISBN 978-0-07-043043-3.
- Musser, Gary L.; Peterson, Blake E.; Burger, William F. (2013). Mathematics for Elementary Teachers: A contemporary approach (10th ed.). Wiley. ISBN 978-1-118-45744-3.
- Quine, Willard (1960). Word and Object. Technology Press (MIT). LCCN 60-9621.
- Russell, Bertrand (1920) [1919]. Introduction to Mathematical Philosophy (2nd ed.). London: George Allen & Unwin.
- Szczepanski, Amy F.; Kositsky, Andrew P. (2008). The Complete Idiot's Guide to Pre-algebra. Penguin Group. ISBN 978-1-59257-772-9.
- Tao, Terence (2016). Analysis I. Texts and Readings in Mathematics. Vol. 37. Singapore: Springer. p. 68. doi:10.1007/978-981-10-1789-6. ISBN 978-981-10-1789-6.
- Thomson, Brian S.; Bruckner, Judith B.; Bruckner, Andrew M. (2008). Elementary Real Analysis (2nd ed.). ClassicalRealAnalysis.com. ISBN 978-1-4348-4367-8.
- von Neumann, John (1923). "Zur Einführung der transfiniten Zahlen" [On the Introduction of the Transfinite Numbers]. Acta Litterarum AC Scientiarum Ragiae Universitatis Hungaricae Francisco-Josephinae, Sectio Scientiarum Mathematicarum. 1: 199–208.
  - von Neumann, John (January 2002) [1923]. "On the introduction of transfinite numbers". In van Heijenoort, Jean (ed.). From Frege to Gödel: A source book in mathematical logic, 1879–1931 (3rd ed.). Harvard University Press. pp. 346–354. ISBN 978-0-674-32449-7. – English translation of von Neumann (1923).
