= Cumulative hierarchy =

Family of sets indexed by ordinal numbers

In mathematics, specifically set theory, a cumulative hierarchy is a family of sets $W_\alpha$ indexed by ordinal numbers $\alpha$ such that

- $W_\alpha \subseteq W_{\alpha + 1}$, and
- if $\lambda$ is a limit ordinal, then $W_\lambda = \bigcup_{\alpha < \lambda} W_{\alpha}$.

Some authors additionally require that $W_{\alpha + 1} \subseteq \mathcal P(W_\alpha)$.

The union over all ordinals $W = \bigcup_{\alpha \in \mathrm{On}} W_\alpha$ of the sets of a cumulative hierarchy is often used as a model of set theory. The phrase "the cumulative hierarchy" usually refers to the von Neumann hierarchy, which has $W_{\alpha + 1} = \mathcal P(W_\alpha)$.

== Reflection principle ==
Cumulative hierarchies satisfy a form of the reflection principle: any formula in the language of set theory that holds in the union $W$ of the hierarchy also holds in some stage $W_\alpha$.

== Examples ==
- The von Neumann universe is built from a cumulative hierarchy $V_\alpha$.
- The sets $L_\alpha$ of the constructible universe form a cumulative hierarchy.
- The Boolean-valued models constructed by forcing are built using a cumulative hierarchy.
- The well-founded sets in a model of set theory (possibly not satisfying the axiom of foundation) form a cumulative hierarchy whose union satisfies the axiom of foundation.
