= Silver's dichotomy =

Statement about equivalence relations

In descriptive set theory, a branch of mathematics, Silver's dichotomy (also known as Silver's theorem) is a statement about equivalence relations, named after Jack Silver.

== Statement and history ==
A relation is said to be coanalytic if its complement is an analytic set. Silver's dichotomy is a statement about the equivalence classes of a coanalytic equivalence relation, stating any coanalytic equivalence relation either has countably many equivalence classes, or else there is a perfect set of reals that are each incomparable to each other. In the latter case, there must be continuum many equivalence classes of the relation.

The first published proof of Silver's dichotomy was by Jack Silver, appearing in 1980 in order to answer a question posed by Harvey Friedman. One application of Silver's dichotomy appearing in recursive set theory is since equality restricted to a set $X$ is coanalytic, there is no Borel equivalence relation $R$ such that $(=\upharpoonright\aleph_0)\leq_B R\leq_B (=\upharpoonright 2^{\aleph_0})$, where $\leq_B$ denotes Borel equivalence relation. Some later results motivated by Silver's dichotomy founded a new field known as invariant descriptive set theory, which studies definable equivalence relations. Silver's dichotomy also admits several weaker recursive versions, which have been compared in strength with subsystems of second-order arithmetic from reverse mathematics, while Silver's dichotomy itself is provably equivalent to $\Pi_1^1\mathsf{-CA}_0$ over $\mathsf{RCA}_0$.
