= Friedman translation =

In mathematical logic, the Friedman translation is a certain transformation of formulas. Among other things it can be used to show that the Π^{0}_{2}-theorems of various first-order theories of classical mathematics are also theorems of intuitionistic mathematics. It is named after its discoverer, Harvey Friedman.

== Definition ==
Let A and B be formulas, where no free variable of B is quantified in A. The translation A^{B} is defined by replacing each atomic subformula C of A by C ∨ B. For purposes of the translation, ⊥ is considered to be an atomic formula as well; hence it is replaced with ⊥ ∨ B (which is equivalent to B). The translation is relevant in an intuitionistic context and here ¬A is generally defined as an abbreviation for A → ⊥; hence (¬A)^{B} = A^{B} → B.

== Application ==
The Friedman translation can be used to show the closure of many intuitionistic theories under the Markov rule, and to obtain partial conservativity results. The key condition is that the $\Delta^0_0$-sentences of the logic be decidable, allowing the unquantified theorems of the intuitionistic and classical theories to coincide.

For example, if A is provable in Heyting arithmetic (HA), then A^{B} is also provable in HA. Moreover, if A is a Σ^{0}_{1}-formula, then A^{B} is in HA equivalent to A ∨ B. By setting B = A, this implies that:

- Heyting arithmetic is closed under the primitive recursive Markov rule (MP_{PR}): if the formula ¬¬A is provable in HA, where A is a Σ^{0}_{1}-formula, then A is also provable in HA.
- Peano arithmetic is Π^{0}_{2}-conservative over Heyting arithmetic: if Peano arithmetic proves a Π^{0}_{2}-formula A, then A is already provable in HA.

== See also ==
- Gödel–Gentzen negative translation
