= Limited principle of omniscience =

Mathematical concept

In constructive mathematics, the limited principle of omniscience (LPO) and the lesser limited principle of omniscience (LLPO) are axioms that are nonconstructive but are weaker than the full law of the excluded middle. They are used to gauge the amount of nonconstructivity required for an argument, as in constructive reverse mathematics. These principles are also related to weak counterexamples in the sense of Brouwer.

== Definitions ==
The limited principle of omniscience states LPO (Bridges & Richman 1987, p. 3):

For any sequence $a_0, a_1, ...$ such that each $a_i$ is either $0$ or $1$, the following holds: either $a_i=0$ for all $i$, or there is a $k$ with $a_k=1$.

The second disjunct can be expressed as $\exists k. a_k \neq 0$ and is constructively stronger than the negation of the first, $\neg\forall k. a_k = 0$. The weak schema in which the former is replaced with the latter (called WLPO) represents particular instances of excluded middle.

The lesser limited principle of omniscience LLPO states:

For any sequence $a_0, a_1, ...$ such that each $a_i$ is either $0$ or $1$, and such that at most one $a_i$ is nonzero, the following holds: either $a_{2i}=0$ for all $i$, or $a_{2i+1}=0$ for all $i$.

Here $a_{2i}$ and $a_{2i+1}$ are entries with even and odd index respectively.

It can be proved constructively that the law of the excluded middle implies LPO, and LPO implies LLPO. However, none of these implications can be reversed in typical systems of constructive mathematics.

=== Terminology ===
The term "omniscience" comes from a thought experiment regarding how a mathematician might tell which of the two cases in the conclusion of LPO holds for a given sequence $(a_i)$. Answering the question "is there a $k$ with $a_k=1$?" negatively, assuming the answer is negative, seems to require surveying the entire sequence. Because this would require the examination of infinitely many terms, the axiom stating it is possible to make this determination was dubbed an "omniscience principle" by Bishop (1967).

== Variants ==
=== Logical versions ===
The two principles can be expressed as purely logical principles, by casting it in terms of decidable predicates on the naturals. I.e. $P$ for which $\forall n. P(n)\lor \neg P(n)$ does hold.

The lesser principle corresponds to a predicate version of that De Morgan's law that does not hold intuitionistically, i.e. the distributivity of negation of a conjunction.

=== Analytic versions ===
Both principles have analogous properties in the theory of real numbers. The analytic LPO states that every real number satisfies the trichotomy $x < 0$ or $x = 0$ or $x > 0$ . The analytic LLPO states that every real number satisfies the dichotomy $x \geq 0$ or $x \leq 0$, while the analytic Markov's principle states that if $x \le 0$ is false, then $x > 0$.

All three analytic principles if assumed to hold for the Dedekind or Cauchy real numbers imply their arithmetic versions, while the converse is true if we assume (weak) countable choice, as shown in Bishop (1967).

== See also ==
- Constructive analysis
