= Harrop formula =

In intuitionistic logic, the Harrop formulae, named after Ronald Harrop, are the class of formulae inductively defined as follows:

- Atomic formulae are Harrop, including falsity (⊥);
- $A \wedge B$ is Harrop provided $A$ and $B$ are;
- $\neg F$ is Harrop for any well-formed formula $F$;
- $F \rightarrow A$ is Harrop provided $A$ is, and $F$ is any well-formed formula;
- $\forall x. A$ is Harrop provided $A$ is.

By excluding disjunction and existential quantification (except in the antecedent of implication), non-constructive predicates are avoided, which has benefits for computer implementation.

== Discussion ==
Harrop formulae are more "well-behaved" also in a constructive context. For example, in Heyting arithmetic ${\mathsf{HA}}$, Harrop formulae satisfy a classical equivalence not generally satisfied in constructive logic:

$$\neg \neg A \leftrightarrow A.$$

But there are still $\Pi_1$-statements that are ${\mathsf{PA}}$-independent, meaning these are Harrop formulae $\forall x. A$ for which excluded middle is however not ${\mathsf{HA}}$-provable. The standard example is the arithmetized consistency of ${\mathsf{PA}}$ (or ${\mathsf{HA}}$-equivalently that of ${\mathsf{HA}}$). So

$${\mathsf{HA}}\vdash \neg\neg{\mathrm{Con}}({\mathsf{HA}})\leftrightarrow {\mathrm{Con}}({\mathsf{HA}})$$

but

$${\mathsf{HA}}\nvdash {\mathrm{Con}}({\mathsf{HA}})\lor \neg{\mathrm{Con}}({\mathsf{HA}}).$$

And a plain disjunction is never Harrop itself, in the syntactic sense. So the above is compatible with the fact that intuitionistic logic itself already proves $\neg\neg(P\lor \neg P)$ indeed for any $P$.

Note that Harrop formulea in the syntactic sense are equivalent to non-Harrop formulas, for example through explosion as $A\leftrightarrow (A\lor\bot)$.

== Hereditary Harrop formulae and logic programming ==
A more complex definition of hereditary Harrop formulae is used in logic programming as a generalisation of Horn clauses, and forms the basis for the language λProlog. Hereditary Harrop formulae are defined in terms of two (sometimes three) recursive sets of formulae. In one formulation:

- Rigid atomic formulae, i.e. constants $r$ or formulae $r(t_1,...,t_n)$, are hereditary Harrop;
- $A \wedge B$ is hereditary Harrop provided $A$ and $B$ are;
- $\forall x. A$ is hereditary Harrop provided $A$ is;
- $G \rightarrow A$ is hereditary Harrop provided $A$ is rigidly atomic, and $G$ is a G-formula.

G-formulae are defined as follows:

- Atomic formulae are G-formulae, including truth(⊤);
- $A \wedge B$ is a G-formula provided $A$ and $B$ are;
- $A \vee B$ is a G-formula provided $A$ and $B$ are;
- $\forall x. A$ is a G-formula provided $A$ is;
- $\exists x. A$ is a G-formula provided $A$ is;
- $H \rightarrow A$ is a G-formula provided $A$ is, and $H$ is hereditary Harrop.

== History ==
Harrop formulae were introduced around 1956 by Ronald Harrop and independently by Helena Rasiowa. Variations of the fundamental concept are used in different branches of constructive mathematics and logic programming.

== See also ==
- Realizability
