= Kleene's T predicate =

Concept in computability theory

In computability theory, the T predicate, first studied by mathematician Stephen Cole Kleene, is a particular set of triples of natural numbers that is used to represent computable functions within formal theories of arithmetic. Informally, the T predicate tells whether a particular computer program will halt when run with a particular input, and the corresponding U function is used to obtain the results of the computation if the program does halt. As with the s_{mn} theorem, the original notation used by Kleene has become standard terminology for the concept.

== Definition ==
Example call of T_{1}. The 1st argument gives the source code (in C rather than as a Gödel number e) of a computable function, viz. the Collatz function f. The 2nd argument gives the natural number i to which f is to be applied. The 3rd argument gives a sequence x of computation steps simulating the evaluation of f on i (as an equation chain rather than a Gödel sequence number). The predicate call evaluates to true since x is actually the correct computation sequence for the call f(5), and ends with an expression not involving f anymore. The function U, applied to the sequence x, will return its final expression, viz. 1.

The definition depends on a suitable Gödel numbering that assigns natural numbers to computable functions (given as Turing machines). This numbering must be sufficiently effective that, given an index of a computable function and an input to the function, it is possible to effectively simulate the computation of the function on that input. The $T$ predicate is obtained by formalizing this simulation.

The ternary relation $T_1(e,i,x)$ takes three natural numbers as arguments. $T_1(e,i,x)$ is true if $x$ encodes a computation history of the computable function with index $e$ when run with input $i$, and the program halts as the last step of this computation history. That is,

- $T_1$ first asks whether $x$ is the Gödel number of a finite sequence $\langle x_{j} \rangle$ of complete configurations of the Turing machine with index $e$, running a computation on input $i$.
- If so, $T_1$ then asks if this sequence begins with the starting state of the computation and each successive element of the sequence corresponds to a single step of the Turing machine.
- If it does, $T_1$ finally asks whether the sequence $\langle x_{j} \rangle$ ends with the machine in a halting state.

If all three of these questions have a positive answer, then $T_1(e,i,x)$ is true, otherwise, it is false.

The $T_1$ predicate is primitive recursive in the sense that there is a primitive recursive function that, given inputs for the predicate, correctly determines the truth value of the predicate on those inputs.

There is a corresponding primitive recursive function $U$ such that if $T_1(e,i,x)$ is true then $U(x)$ returns the output of the function with index $e$ on input $i$.

Because Kleene's formalism attaches a number of inputs to each function, the predicate $T_1$ can only be used for functions that take one input. There are additional predicates for functions with multiple inputs; the relation

$$T_k(e, i_1, \ldots, i_k, x)$$

is true if $x$ encodes a halting computation of the function with index $e$ on the inputs $i_1,\ldots,i_k$.

Like $T_1$, all functions $T_k$ are primitive recursive. Because of this, any theory of arithmetic that is able to represent every primitive recursive function is able to represent $T$ and $U$. Examples of such arithmetical theories include Robinson arithmetic and stronger theories such as Peano arithmetic.

== Normal form theorem ==
The $T_k$ predicates can be used to obtain Kleene's normal form theorem for computable functions (Soare 1987, p. 15; Kleene 1943, p. 52—53). This states there exists a fixed primitive recursive function $U$ such that a function $f:\mathbb{N}^{k}\rightarrow\mathbb{N}$ is computable if and only if there is a number $e$ such that for all $n_1,\ldots,n_k$ one has

$$f(n_1,\ldots,n_k) \simeq U( \mu x\, T_k(e,n_1,\ldots,n_k,x))$$,

where μ is the μ operator ($\mu x\, \phi(x)$ is the smallest natural number for which $\phi(x)$ is true) and $\simeq$ is true if both sides are undefined or if both are defined and they are equal. By the theorem, the definition of every general recursive function f can be rewritten into a normal form such that the μ operator is used only once, viz. immediately below the topmost $U$, which is independent of the computable function $f$.

== Arithmetical hierarchy ==
In addition to encoding computability, the T predicate can be used to generate complete sets in the arithmetical hierarchy. In particular, the set

$$K = \{ e \mbox{ } : \mbox{ } \exists x T_1(e,0,x) \}$$

which is of the same Turing degree as the halting problem, is a $\Sigma^0_1$ complete unary relation (Soare 1987, pp. 28, 41). More generally, the set

$$K_{n+1} = \{ \langle e, a_1, \ldots, a_n\rangle : \exists x T_n(e, a_1, \ldots, a_n, x)\}$$

is a $\Sigma^0_1$-complete (n+1)-ary predicate. Thus, once a representation of the T_{n} predicate is obtained in a theory of arithmetic, a representation of a $\Sigma^0_1$-complete predicate can be obtained from it.

This construction can be extended higher in the arithmetical hierarchy, as in Post's theorem (compare Hinman 2005, p. 397). For example, if a set $A \subseteq \mathbb{N}^{k+1}$ is $\Sigma^0_{n}$ complete then the set

$$\{ \langle a_1, \ldots, a_k\rangle : \forall x ( \langle a_1, \ldots, a_k, x\rangle \in A)\}$$

is $\Pi^0_{n+1}$ complete.
