= Induction, bounding and least number principles =

In first-order arithmetic, the induction principles, bounding principles, and least number principles are three related families of first-order principles, which may or may not hold in nonstandard models of arithmetic. These principles are often used in reverse mathematics to calibrate the axiomatic strength of theorems.

== Definitions ==
Informally, for a first-order formula of arithmetic $\varphi(x)$ with one free variable, the induction principle for $\varphi$ expresses the validity of mathematical induction over $\varphi$, while the least number principle for $\varphi$ asserts that if $\varphi$ has a witness, it has a least one. For a formula $\psi(x,y)$ in two free variables, the bounding principle for $\psi$ states that, for a fixed bound $k$, if for every $n < k$ there is $m_n$ such that $\psi(n,m_n)$, then we can find a bound on the $m_n$'s.

Formally, the induction principle for $\varphi$ is the sentence:

$$\mathsf{I}\varphi: \quad \big[ \varphi(0) \land \forall x \big( \varphi(x) \to \varphi(x+1) \big) \big] \to \forall x\ \varphi (x)$$

There is a similar strong induction principle for $\varphi$:

$$\mathsf{I}'\varphi: \quad \forall x \big[ \big( \forall y<x\ \ \varphi(y) \big) \to \varphi(x) \big] \to \forall x\ \varphi (x)$$

The least number principle for $\varphi$ is the sentence:

$$\mathsf{L}\varphi: \quad \exists x\ \varphi (x) \to \exists x' \big( \varphi (x') \land \forall y < x'\ \, \lnot \varphi(y) \big)$$

Finally, the bounding principle for $\psi$ is the sentence:

$$\mathsf{B}\psi: \quad \forall u \big[ \big( \forall x < u\ \, \exists y\ \, \psi(x,y) \big) \to \exists v\ \, \forall x < u\ \, \exists y < v\ \, \psi(x,y) \big]$$

More commonly, we consider these principles not just for a single formula, but for a class of formulae in the arithmetical hierarchy. For example, $\mathsf{I}\Sigma_2$ is the axiom schema consisting of $\mathsf{I}\varphi$ for every $\Sigma_2$ formula $\varphi(x)$ in one free variable.

== Nonstandard models ==
It may seem that the principles $\mathsf{I}\varphi$, $\mathsf{I}'\varphi$, $\mathsf{L}\varphi$, $\mathsf{B}\psi$ are trivial, and indeed, they hold for all formulae $\varphi$, $\psi$ in the standard model of arithmetic $\mathbb{N}$. However, they become more relevant in nonstandard models. Recall that a nonstandard model of arithmetic has the form $\mathbb{N} + \mathbb{Z} \cdot K$ for some linear order $K$. In other words, it consists of an initial copy of $\mathbb{N}$, whose elements are called finite or standard, followed by many copies of $\mathbb{Z}$ arranged in the shape of $K$, whose elements are called infinite or nonstandard.

Now, considering the principles $\mathsf{I}\varphi$, $\mathsf{I}'\varphi$, $\mathsf{L}\varphi$, $\mathsf{B}\psi$ in a nonstandard model $\mathcal{M}$, we can see how they might fail. For example, the hypothesis of the induction principle $\mathsf{I}\varphi$ only ensures that $\varphi(x)$ holds for all elements in the standard part of $\mathcal{M}$ - it may not hold for the nonstandard elements, who can't be reached by iterating the successor operation from zero. Similarly, the bounding principle $\mathsf{B}\psi$ might fail if the bound $u$ is nonstandard, as then the (infinite) collection of $y$ could be cofinal in $\mathcal{M}$.

== Relations between the principles ==
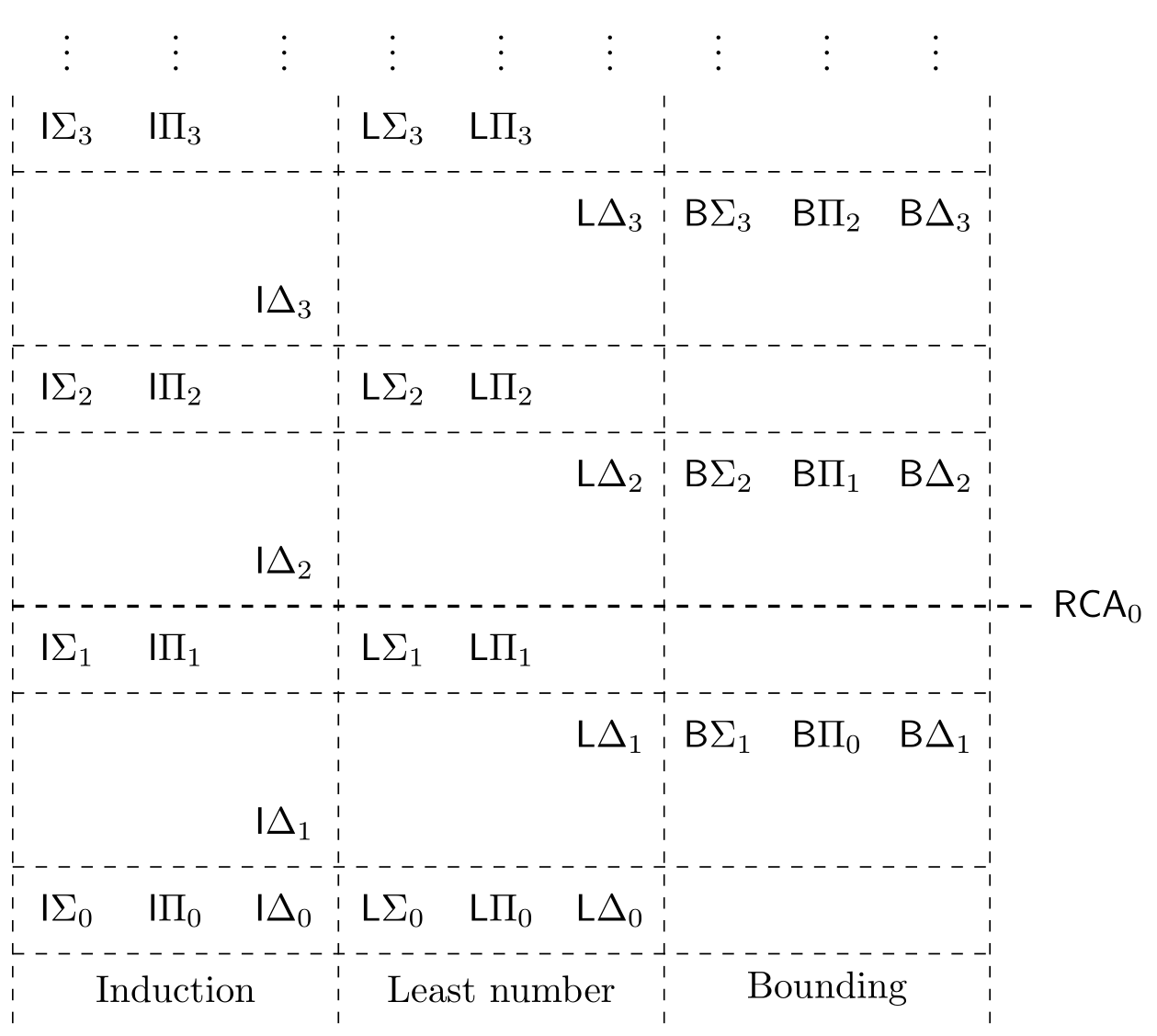
The relations between the induction, bounding and least number principles.

The following relations hold between the principles (over the weak base theory $\mathsf{PA}^- +\mathsf{I}\Sigma_0$):

- $\mathsf{I}'\varphi \equiv \mathsf{L}\lnot\varphi$ for every formula $\varphi$;
- $\mathsf{I}\Sigma_n \equiv \mathsf{I}\Pi_n \equiv \mathsf{I}'\Sigma_n \equiv \mathsf{I}'\Pi_n \equiv \mathsf{L}\Sigma_n \equiv \mathsf{L}\Pi_n$;
- $\mathsf{I}\Sigma_{n+1} \implies \mathsf{B}\Sigma_{n+1} \implies \mathsf{I}\Sigma_n$, and both implications are strict;
- $\mathsf{B}\Sigma_{n+1} \equiv \mathsf{B}\Pi_n \equiv \mathsf{L}\Delta_{n+1}$;
- $\mathsf{L}\Delta_n \implies \mathsf{I}\Delta_n$, but it is not known if this reverses.

Over $\mathsf{PA}^- +\mathsf{I}\Sigma_0 + \mathsf{exp}$, Slaman proved that $\mathsf{B}\Sigma_n \equiv \mathsf{L}\Delta_n \equiv \mathsf{I}\Delta_n$.

== Reverse mathematics ==
The induction, bounding and least number principles are commonly used in reverse mathematics and second-order arithmetic. For example, $\mathsf{I}\Sigma_1$ is part of the definition of the subsystem $\mathsf{RCA}_0$ of second-order arithmetic. Hence, $\mathsf{I}'\Sigma_1$, $\mathsf{L}\Sigma_1$ and $\mathsf{B}\Sigma_1$ are all theorems of $\mathsf{RCA}_0$. The subsystem $\mathsf{ACA}_0$ proves all the principles $\mathsf{I}\varphi$, $\mathsf{I}'\varphi$, $\mathsf{L}\varphi$, $\mathsf{B}\psi$ for arithmetical $\varphi$, $\psi$. The infinite pigeonhole principle is known to be equivalent to $\mathsf{B}\Pi_1$ and $\mathsf{B}\Sigma_2$ over $\mathsf{RCA}_0$.
