= Reverse mathematics =

Branch of mathematical logic

Reverse mathematics is a program in mathematical logic that seeks to determine which axioms are required to prove theorems of mathematics. Its defining method can briefly be described as "going backwards from the theorems to the axioms", in contrast to the ordinary mathematical practice of deriving theorems from axioms. It can be conceptualized as sculpting out necessary conditions from sufficient ones.

The reverse mathematics program was foreshadowed by results in set theory such as the classical theorem that the axiom of choice and Zorn's lemma are equivalent over ZF set theory. The goal of reverse mathematics, however, is to study possible axioms of ordinary theorems of mathematics rather than possible axioms for set theory. Reverse mathematics is usually carried out using subsystems of second-order arithmetic, where many of its definitions and methods are inspired by previous work in constructive analysis and proof theory. The use of second-order arithmetic also allows many techniques from recursion theory to be employed; many results in reverse mathematics have corresponding results in computable analysis. In higher-order reverse mathematics, the focus is on subsystems of higher-order arithmetic, and the associated richer languages.

Richer languages are generated through analysis of the axiomatic strength of mathematical theorems utilizing the language defined as all finite types. This richer language allows for a more natural direct formalization of core concepts of modern analysis, topology and functionals.

The program was founded by Harvey Friedman and brought forward by Steve Simpson.

Constructive reverse mathematics is related program which is applied to constructive mathematics.

== General principles ==
In reverse mathematics, one starts with a framework language and a base theory—a core axiom system—that is too weak to prove most of the theorems one might be interested in, but still powerful enough to develop the definitions necessary to state these theorems. For example, to study the theorem "Every bounded sequence of real numbers has a supremum" it is necessary to use a base system that can speak of real numbers and sequences of real numbers.

For each theorem that can be stated in the base system but is not provable in the base system, the goal is to determine the particular axiom system (stronger than the base system) that is necessary to prove that theorem. To show that a system S is required to prove a theorem T, two proofs are required. The first proof shows T is provable from S; this is an ordinary mathematical proof along with a justification that it can be carried out in the system S. The second proof, known as a reversal, shows that T itself implies S; this proof is carried out in the base system. The reversal establishes that no axiom system S′ that extends the base system can be weaker than S while still proving T.

=== Use of second-order arithmetic ===
Most reverse mathematics research focuses on subsystems of second-order arithmetic. The body of research in reverse mathematics has established that weak subsystems of second-order arithmetic suffice to formalize almost all undergraduate-level mathematics. In second-order arithmetic, all objects can be represented as either natural numbers or sets of natural numbers. For example, in order to prove theorems about real numbers, the real numbers can be represented as Cauchy sequences of rational numbers, each of which sequence can be represented as a set of natural numbers.

The axiom systems most often considered in reverse mathematics are defined using axiom schemes called comprehension schemes. Such a scheme states that any set of natural numbers definable by a formula of a given complexity exists. In this context, the complexity of formulas is measured using the arithmetical hierarchy and analytical hierarchy.

The reason that reverse mathematics is not carried out using set theory as a base system is that the language of set theory is too expressive. Extremely complex sets of natural numbers can be defined by simple formulas in the language of set theory (which can quantify over arbitrary sets). In the context of second-order arithmetic, results such as Post's theorem establish a close link between the complexity of a formula and the (non)computability of the set it defines.

Another effect of using second-order arithmetic is the need to restrict general mathematical theorems to forms that can be expressed within arithmetic. For example, second-order arithmetic can express the principle "Every countable vector space has a basis" but it cannot express the principle "Every vector space has a basis". In practical terms, this means that theorems of algebra and combinatorics are restricted to countable structures, while theorems of analysis and topology are restricted to separable spaces. Many principles that imply the axiom of choice in their general form (such as "Every vector space has a basis") become provable in weak subsystems of second-order arithmetic when they are restricted. For example, "every field has an algebraic closure" is not provable in ZF set theory, but the restricted form "every countable field has an algebraic closure" is provable in RCA_{0}, the weakest system typically employed in reverse mathematics.

=== Use of higher-order arithmetic ===
A recent strand of higher-order reverse mathematics research, initiated by Ulrich Kohlenbach in 2005, focuses on subsystems of higher-order arithmetic. Due to the richer language of higher-order arithmetic, the use of representations (also known as 'codes') common in second-order arithmetic, is greatly reduced. For example, a continuous function on the Cantor space is just a function that maps binary sequences to binary sequences, and that also satisfies the usual 'epsilon–delta'-definition of continuity.

Higher-order reverse mathematics includes higher-order versions of (second-order) comprehension schemes. Such a higher-order axiom states the existence of a functional that decides the truth or falsity of formulas of a given complexity. In this context, the complexity of formulas is also measured using the arithmetical hierarchy and analytical hierarchy. The higher-order counterparts of the major subsystems of second-order arithmetic generally prove the same second-order sentences (or a large subset) as the original second-order systems. For instance, the base theory of higher-order reverse mathematics, called RCA^{ω}_{0}, proves the same sentences as RCA_{0}, up to language.

As noted in the previous paragraph, second-order comprehension axioms easily generalize to the higher-order framework. However, theorems expressing the compactness of basic spaces behave quite differently in second- and higher-order arithmetic: on one hand, when restricted to countable covers/the language of second-order arithmetic, the compactness of the unit interval is provable in WKL_{0} from the next section. On the other hand, given uncountable covers/the language of higher-order arithmetic, the compactness of the unit interval is only provable from (full) second-order arithmetic. Other covering lemmas (e.g. due to Lindelöf, Vitali, Besicovitch, etc.) exhibit the same behavior, and many basic properties of the gauge integral are equivalent to the compactness of the underlying space.

== The big five subsystems of second-order arithmetic ==
Second-order arithmetic is a formal theory of the natural numbers and sets of natural numbers. Many mathematical objects, such as countable rings, groups, and fields, as well as points in effective Polish spaces, can be represented as sets of natural numbers, and modulo this representation can be studied in second-order arithmetic.

Reverse mathematics makes use of several subsystems of second-order arithmetic. A typical reverse mathematics theorem shows that a particular mathematical theorem T is equivalent to a particular subsystem S of second-order arithmetic over a weaker subsystem B. This weaker system B is known as the base system for the result; in order for the reverse mathematics result to have meaning, this system must not itself be able to prove the mathematical theorem T.

Steve Simpson describes five particular subsystems of second-order arithmetic, which he calls the Big Five, that occur frequently in reverse mathematics. In order of increasing strength, these systems are named by the initialisms RCA_{0}, WKL_{0}, ACA_{0}, ATR_{0}, and Π^{1}_{1}-CA_{0}.

The following table summarizes the "big five" systems and lists the counterpart systems in higher-order arithmetic. The latter generally prove the same second-order sentences (or a large subset) as the original second-order systems.

Subsystem	Stands for	Ordinal	Corresponds roughly to	Comments	Higher-order counterpart
RCA_{0}	Recursive comprehension axiom	ω^{ω}	Constructive mathematics (Bishop)	The base theory	RCA^{ω}_{0}; proves the same second-order sentences as RCA_{0}
WKL_{0}	Weak Kőnig's lemma	ω^{ω}	Finitistic reductionism (Hilbert)	Conservative over PRA (resp. RCA_{0}) for Π^{0}_{2} (resp. Π^{1}_{1}) sentences	Fan functional; computes modulus of uniform continuity on $2^{\mathbb{N}}$ for continuous functions
ACA_{0}	Arithmetical comprehension axiom	ε_{0}	Predicativism (Weyl, Feferman)	Conservative over Peano arithmetic for arithmetical sentences	The 'Turing jump' functional ∃^{2} expresses the existence of a discontinuous function on ℝ
ATR_{0}	Arithmetical transfinite recursion	Γ_{0}	Predicative reductionism (Friedman, Simpson)	Conservative over Feferman's system IR for Π^{1}_{1} sentences	The 'transfinite recursion' functional outputs the set claimed to exist by ATR_{0}.
Π^{1}_{1}-CA_{0}	Π^{1}_{1} comprehension axiom	Ψ_{0}(Ω_{ω})	Impredicativism		The Suslin functional S^{2} decides Π^{1}_{1}-formulas (restricted to second-order parameters).

The subscript _{0} in these names means that the induction scheme has been restricted from the full second-order induction scheme. For example, ACA_{0} includes the induction axiom (0 ∈ X $\wedge$ ∀n(n ∈ X → n + 1 ∈ X)) → ∀n n ∈ X. This together with the full comprehension axiom of second-order arithmetic implies the full second-order induction scheme given by the universal closure of (φ(0) $\wedge$ ∀n(φ(n) → φ(n+1))) → ∀n φ(n) for any second-order formula φ. However ACA_{0} does not have the full comprehension axiom, and the subscript _{0} is a reminder that it does not have the full second-order induction scheme either. This restriction is important: systems with restricted induction have significantly lower proof-theoretical ordinals than systems with the full second-order induction scheme.

=== Base system RCA_{0} ===
RCA_{0} is the fragment of second-order arithmetic whose axioms are the axioms of Robinson arithmetic, induction axiom scheme for Σ^{0}_{1} formulas, and comprehension axiom scheme for Δ^{0}_{1} formulas (also called recursive comprehension).

The $\Sigma_1^0$-induction axiom scheme states
$$\quad \big[ \varphi(0) \land \forall x \big( \varphi(x) \to \varphi(x+1) \big) \big] \to \forall x\ \varphi (x)$$
for all $\Sigma_1^0$-formulas $\varphi$ that do not quantify over set variables. More explicitly, these are formulas of the form
$$\exists x_1\exists x_2\cdots \exists x_n \phi$$
where $\phi$ is a $\Delta_0^0$-formula that can include set variables. In words, $\varphi$ is obtained by starting with a quantifier-free formula that can involve both first-order and second-order variables, then adding bounded quantifiers over the first-order variables, and finally adding existential quantifiers over the first-order variables.

The $\Delta_1^0$-comprehension axiom scheme states that
$$\forall n [\psi(n) \leftrightarrow\varphi(n) ]\to \exists X \forall n [n \in X \leftrightarrow \varphi(n)]$$
for all $\Pi_1^0$-formulas $\psi$ and all $\Sigma_1^0$-formulas $\varphi$.

The subsystem RCA_{0} is the one most commonly used as a base system for reverse mathematics. The initials "RCA" stand for "recursive comprehension axiom", where "recursive" means "computable", as in computable function. This name is used because RCA_{0} corresponds informally to "computable mathematics". In particular, any set of natural numbers that can be proven to exist in RCA_{0} is computable, and thus any theorem that implies that noncomputable sets exist is not provable in RCA_{0}. To this extent, RCA_{0} is a constructive system, although it does not meet the requirements of the program of constructivism because it is a theory in classical logic including the law of excluded middle.

Despite its seeming weakness (of not proving any non-computable sets exist), RCA_{0} is sufficient to prove a number of classical theorems which, therefore, require only minimal logical strength. These theorems are, in a sense, below the reach of the reverse mathematics enterprise because they are already provable in the base system. The classical theorems provable in RCA_{0} include:

- Basic properties of the natural numbers, integers, and rational numbers (for example, that the latter form an ordered field).
- Basic properties of the real numbers (the real numbers are an Archimedean ordered field; any nested sequence of closed intervals whose lengths tend to zero has a single point in its intersection; the real numbers are not countable).
- The Baire category theorem for a complete separable metric space (the separability condition is necessary to even state the theorem in the language of second-order arithmetic).
- The intermediate value theorem on continuous real functions.
- The Banach–Steinhaus theorem for a sequence of continuous linear operators on separable Banach spaces.
- A weak version of Gödel's completeness theorem (for a set of sentences, in a countable language, that is already closed under consequence).
- The existence of an algebraic closure for a countable field (but not its uniqueness).
- The existence and uniqueness of the real closure of a countable ordered field.

The first-order part of RCA_{0} (the theorems of the system that do not involve any set variables) is the set of theorems of first-order Peano arithmetic with induction limited to Σ^{0}_{1} formulas. It is provably consistent, as is RCA_{0}, in full first-order Peano arithmetic.

=== Weak Kőnig's lemma WKL_{0} ===
The subsystem WKL_{0} consists of RCA_{0} plus a weak form of Kőnig's lemma, namely the statement that every infinite subtree of the full binary tree (the tree of all finite sequences of 0s and 1s) has an infinite path. This proposition, which is known as weak Kőnig's lemma, is easy to state in the language of second-order arithmetic.

In first-order arithmetic, WKL_{0} is more easily defined by adding the axiom scheme of Σ^{0}_{1}-separation: given two Σ^{0}_{1} formulas of a free variable n that are exclusive, there is a set containing all n satisfying the one and no n satisfying the other. In symbols:
$$\forall n \neg [\varphi(n) \and \psi(n)] \to \exists X \forall n[(\varphi(n) \to n \in X) \and (\psi(n) \to n \not\in X)]$$
for all $\Sigma_1^0$-formulas $\varphi, \psi$.

The terminology is somewhat confusing, as the weak Kőnig's lemma itself, as an axiom scheme, is also written as WKL, whereas WKL_{0} stands for a system, not a variant of the WKL axiom scheme.

(The first-order part of RCA_{0}) + ($\Delta_0^0$-comprehension) + ($\Sigma_1^0$-separation) together implies ($\Delta_1^0$-comprehension).

In a sense, weak Kőnig's lemma is a form of the axiom of choice (although, as stated, it can be proven in classical Zermelo–Fraenkel set theory without the axiom of choice). It is not constructively valid in some senses of the word "constructive".

To show that WKL_{0} is actually stronger than (not provable in) RCA_{0}, note that WKL_{0} implies the existence of separating sets for computationally inseparable recursively enumerable sets. In particular, one can simply write down two $\Sigma_1^0$-formulas $\varphi, \psi$ that define such two sets, then WKL_{0} proves that there exists some $X$ that separates them, whereas the standard model of RCA_{0} contains only computable sets, and therefore there does not exist such a separating set.

It turns out that RCA_{0} and WKL_{0} have the same first-order part, meaning that they prove the same first-order sentences. WKL_{0} can prove a good number of classical mathematical results that do not follow from RCA_{0}, however. These results are not expressible as first-order statements but can be expressed as second-order statements.

The following results are equivalent to weak Kőnig's lemma and thus to WKL_{0} over RCA_{0}:

- The Heine–Borel theorem for the closed unit real interval, in the following sense: every covering by a sequence of open intervals has a finite subcovering.
- The Heine–Borel theorem for complete totally bounded separable metric spaces (where covering is by a sequence of open balls).
- A continuous real function on the closed unit interval (or on any compact separable metric space, as above) is bounded (or: bounded and reaches its bounds).
- A continuous real function on the closed unit interval can be uniformly approximated by polynomials (with rational coefficients).
- A continuous real function on the closed unit interval is uniformly continuous.
- A continuous real function on the closed unit interval is Riemann integrable.
- The Brouwer fixed point theorem (for continuous functions on an n-simplex).
- The separable Hahn–Banach theorem in the form: a bounded linear form on a subspace of a separable Banach space extends to a bounded linear form on the whole space.
- The Jordan curve theorem.
- Gödel's completeness theorem (for a countable language).
- Determinacy for open (or even clopen) games on {0, 1} of length ω.
- Every countable commutative ring has a prime ideal.
- Every countable formally real field is orderable.
- Uniqueness of algebraic closure (for a countable field).
- The De Bruijn–Erdős theorem for countable graphs: every countable graph whose finite subgraphs are k-colorable is k-colorable.

=== Arithmetical comprehension ACA_{0} ===
The system ACA_{0} adds to RCA_{0} the comprehension scheme for arithmetical formulas, also called the arithmetical comprehension axiom (though it is an axiom scheme). That is, ACA_{0} allows us to form the set of natural numbers satisfying an arbitrary arithmetical formula (one with no bound set variables, although possibly containing set parameters). An arithmetical formula is a formula where set variables may occur as parameters, but not quantified. In other words, it is the union $\cup_{n=0}^\infty \Sigma_n^0$.

In symbols:
$$\exists X \forall n [n \in X \leftrightarrow \varphi(n)]$$
for all arithmetical formulas $\varphi$. It also has the restricted induction axiom (not an axiom scheme):
$$0\in X \to \forall n [n \in X \to n + 1 \in X] \to \forall n (n\in X)$$
This is less restricted compared to the $\Sigma_1^0$-induction axiom scheme used in WKL_{0} and RCA_{0}, but still restricted compared to the full induction axiom scheme:
$$\varphi(0) \to \forall n [\varphi(n) \to \varphi(n+1)] \to \forall n[\varphi(n)]$$
for all formulas $\varphi$ in second-order arithmetic. Specifically, the full induction axiom scheme is not necessarily derivable, because ACA_{0} may be unable to prove that $\varphi$ can be comprehended. That is, there are some formulas $\varphi$, such that $\exists X\forall n [n \in X \leftrightarrow \varphi(n)]$ is not provable in ACA_{0}.

As a matter of fact, it suffices to add to RCA_{0} the comprehension scheme for $\Sigma_1^0$-formulas, since one can then take the logical negation to obtain comprehension for $\Pi_1^0$-formulas, and iterate this to obtain comprehension of all levels in the arithmetic hierarchy.

The first-order part of ACA_{0} is exactly first-order Peano arithmetic. In other words, ACA_{0} is a conservative extension of first-order Peano arithmetic. The two systems are provably (in a weak system) equiconsistent. ACA_{0} can be thought of as a framework of predicative mathematics, although there are predicatively provable theorems that are not provable in ACA_{0}. Most of the fundamental results about the natural numbers, and many other mathematical theorems, can be proven in this system.

One way of seeing that ACA_{0} is stronger than WKL_{0} is to exhibit a model of WKL_{0} that does not contain all arithmetical sets. In fact, it is possible to build a model of WKL_{0} consisting entirely of low sets using the low basis theorem, since low sets relative to low sets are low.

The following assertions are equivalent to ACA_{0} over RCA_{0}:

- The sequential completeness of the real numbers (every bounded increasing sequence of real numbers has a limit).
- The Bolzano–Weierstrass theorem.
- Ascoli's theorem: every bounded equicontinuous sequence of real functions on the unit interval has a uniformly convergent subsequence.
- Every countable field embeds isomorphically into its algebraic closure.
- Every countable commutative ring has a maximal ideal.
- Every countable vector space over the rationals (or over any countable field) has a basis.
- For any countable fields K ⊆ L, there is a transcendence basis for L over K.
- Kőnig's lemma (for arbitrary finitely branching trees, as opposed to the weak version described above).
- For any countable group G and any subgroups H, I of G, the subgroup generated by H ∪ I exists.^{p. 40}
- Any partial function can be extended to a total function.
- Higman's lemma.
- Various theorems in combinatorics, such as certain forms of Ramsey's theorem.

=== Arithmetical transfinite recursion ATR_{0} ===
The system ATR_{0} adds to ACA_{0} an axiom scheme, called the arithmetical transfinite recursion. Informally, it states that any arithmetical functional can be iterated transfinitely along any countable well ordering starting with any set.

The axiom scheme of arithmetical transfinite recursion has one axiom per arithmetical formula $\theta(n, Z, \vec x, \vec X)$. The axiom states that: If $(A, <_A)$ is a well-ordered set, then there exists some $Y$, which is a set indexed by $A$ obtained by a well-ordered induction on $A$:

- The whole set is $Y = \{(n, a) : a \in A, n \in Y_a\}$. Each indexed entry is of the form $Y_a = \{n \in \N: (n, a) \in Y\}$. Each initial segment is of the form $Y^a = \{(n, b) : b \in A, b <_A a, n \in Y_b\}$.
  - In particular, the lowest initial segment is empty: $Y^{\min A} = \emptyset$.
- The well-ordered induction begins at $Y^{\min A} = \emptyset$, and proceeds by induction:
  $$Y_a = \{n \in \N : \theta(n, Y^a, \vec x, \vec X)\}$$

ATR_{0} is equivalent over ACA_{0} to the principle of Σ^{1}_{1} separation. ATR_{0} is impredicative, and has the proof-theoretic ordinal Γ_{0}, the supremum of that of predicative systems.

ATR_{0} proves the consistency of ACA_{0}, and thus by Gödel's theorem it is strictly stronger.

The following assertions are equivalent to ATR_{0} over RCA_{0}:

- Any two countable well orderings are comparable. That is, they are isomorphic or one is isomorphic to a proper initial segment of the other.
- Ulm's theorem for countable reduced Abelian groups.
- The perfect set theorem, which states that every uncountable closed subset of a complete separable metric space contains a perfect closed set.
- Lusin's separation theorem (essentially Σ^{1}_{1} separation).
- Determinacy for open sets in the Baire space.

=== Π^{1}_{1} comprehension Π^{1}_{1}-CA_{0} ===
Π^{1}_{1}-CA_{0} is stronger than arithmetical transfinite recursion and is fully impredicative. It consists of RCA_{0}, plus the induction axiom
$$0\in X \to \forall n [n \in X \to n + 1 \in X] \to \forall n (n\in X)$$
plus the comprehension scheme for Π^{1}_{1} formulas.

A $\Pi_1^1$-formula is of the form $\forall X \theta$, where $\theta$ is an arithmetical formula. $\Pi_1^1$-comprehension is the axiom scheme that states
$$\exists X \forall n [n \in X \leftrightarrow \varphi(n)]$$
for all $\Pi_1^1$-formulas $\varphi$.

In a sense, Π^{1}_{1}-CA_{0} comprehension is to arithmetical transfinite recursion (Σ^{1}_{1} separation) as ACA_{0} is to weak Kőnig's lemma (Σ^{0}_{1} separation). It is equivalent to several statements of descriptive set theory whose proofs make use of strongly impredicative arguments; this equivalence shows that these impredicative arguments cannot be removed.

The following theorems are equivalent to Π^{1}_{1}-CA_{0} over RCA_{0}:

- The Cantor–Bendixson theorem (every closed set of reals is the union of a perfect set and a countable set).
- Silver's dichotomy (every coanalytic equivalence relation has either countably many equivalence classes or a perfect set of incomparables)
- Every countable abelian group is the direct sum of a divisible group and a reduced group.
- Determinacy for Σ^{0}_{1} $\wedge$ Π^{0}_{1} games.

== Additional systems ==
- Weaker systems than recursive comprehension can be defined. The weak system RCA^{*}_{0} consists of elementary function arithmetic EFA (the basic axioms plus Δ^{0}_{0} induction in the enriched language, with an exponential operation) plus Δ^{0}_{1} comprehension. Over RCA^{*}_{0}, recursive comprehension as defined earlier (that is, with Σ^{0}_{1} induction) is equivalent to the statement that a polynomial (over a countable field) has only finitely many roots and to the classification theorem for finitely generated Abelian groups. The system RCA^{*}_{0} has the same proof theoretic ordinal ω^{3} as EFA and is conservative over EFA for Π^{0}_{2} sentences.
- Weak Weak Kőnig's Lemma is the statement that a subtree of the infinite binary tree having no infinite paths has an asymptotically vanishing proportion of the leaves at length n (with a uniform estimate as to how many leaves of length n exist). An equivalent formulation is that any subset of Cantor space that has positive measure is nonempty (this is not provable in RCA_{0}). WWKL_{0} is obtained by adjoining this axiom to RCA_{0}. It is equivalent to the statement that if the unit real interval is covered by a sequence of intervals then the sum of their lengths is at least one. The model theory of WWKL_{0} is closely connected to the theory of algorithmically random sequences. In particular, an ω-model of RCA_{0} satisfies weak weak Kőnig's lemma if and only if for every set X there is a set Y that is 1-random relative to X.
- DNR (short for "diagonally non-recursive") adds to RCA_{0} an axiom asserting the existence of a diagonally non-recursive function relative to every set. That is, DNR states that, for any set A, there exists a total function f such that for all e the eth partial recursive function with oracle A is not equal to f. DNR is strictly weaker than WWKL (Lempp et al., 2004).
- Δ^{1}_{1}-comprehension is in certain ways analogous to arithmetical transfinite recursion as recursive comprehension is to weak Kőnig's lemma. It has the hyperarithmetical sets as minimal ω-model. Arithmetical transfinite recursion proves Δ^{1}_{1}-comprehension but not the other way around.
- Σ^{1}_{1}-choice is the statement that if η(n, X) is a Σ^{1}_{1} formula such that for each n there exists an X satisfying η then there is a sequence of sets X_{n} such that η(n, X_{n}) holds for each n. Σ^{1}_{1}-choice also has the hyperarithmetical sets as minimal ω-model. Arithmetical transfinite recursion proves Σ^{1}_{1}-choice but not the other way around.
- HBU (short for "uncountable Heine-Borel") expresses the (open-cover) compactness of the unit interval, involving uncountable covers. The latter aspect of HBU makes it only expressible in the language of third-order arithmetic. Cousin's theorem (1895) implies HBU, and these theorems use the same notion of cover due to Cousin and Lindelöf. HBU is hard to prove: in terms of the usual hierarchy of comprehension axioms, a proof of HBU requires full second-order arithmetic.
- Ramsey's theorem for infinite graphs does not fall into one of the big five subsystems, and there are many other weaker variants with varying proof strengths.

=== Stronger systems ===
Adding the full second-order induction axiom scheme to RCA_{0} results in RCA, the system of recursive comprehension arithmetic with unrestricted induction. Similarly, adding the full second-order induction axiom scheme to WKL_{0} results in WKL, etc.

Over RCA_{0}, Π^{1}_{1} transfinite recursion, ∆^{0}_{2} determinacy, and the ∆^{1}_{1} Ramsey theorem are all equivalent to each other.

Over RCA_{0}, Σ^{1}_{1} monotonic induction, Σ^{0}_{2} determinacy, and the Σ^{1}_{1} Ramsey theorem are all equivalent to each other.

The following are equivalent:

- (schema) Π^{1}_{3} consequences of Π^{1}_{2}-CA_{0}
- RCA_{0} + (schema over finite n) determinacy in the nth level of the difference hierarchy of Σ^{0}_{2} sets
- RCA_{0} + {τ: τ is a true S2S sentence}

The set of Π^{1}_{3} consequences of second-order arithmetic Z_{2} has the same theory as RCA_{0} + (schema over finite n) determinacy in the nth level of the difference hierarchy of Σ^{0}_{3} sets.

For a poset P, let MF(P) denote the topological space consisting of the filters on P whose open sets are the sets of the form {F ∈ MF(P) | p ∈ F} for some p ∈ P. The following statement is equivalent to $\Pi^1_2\mathsf{-CA}_0$ over $\Pi^1_1\mathsf{-CA}_0$: for any countable poset P, the topological space MF(P) is completely metrizable iff it is regular.

== ω-models and β-models ==
The ω in ω-model stands for the set of non-negative integers (or finite ordinals). An ω-model is a model for a fragment of second-order arithmetic whose first-order part is the standard model of Peano arithmetic, but whose second-order part may be non-standard. More precisely, an ω-model is given by a choice $S\subseteq\mathcal P(\omega)$ of subsets of ω. The first-order variables are interpreted in the usual way as elements of ω, and +, × have their usual meanings, while second-order variables are interpreted as elements of S. There is a standard ω-model where one just takes S to consist of all subsets of the integers. However, some theories have other ω-models. For example, RCA_{0} has a minimal ω-model where S consists of the computable subsets of ω. In particular, this model has only countably many subsets, which is strictly smaller than the uncountable $\mathcal P(\omega)$.

A β-model is an ω model that agrees with the standard ω-model on truth of Π^{1}_{1} and Σ^{1}_{1} sentences (with parameters).

Non-ω models are also useful, especially in the proofs of conservation theorems.

== Constructive reverse mathematics ==
Constructive reverse mathematics is a program which is applied to constructive mathematics, and is used to classify theorems using logical principles, function existence axioms, and their combinations. It involves classifying theorems into 4 main systems: BISH (Bishop-style constructive mathematics), CLASS, INT, and RUSS.

== See also ==
- Closed-form expression § Conversion from numerical forms
- Induction, bounding and least number principles
- Ordinal analysis
