= Computable real function =

In mathematical logic, specifically computability theory, a function $f: \R \to \R$ is sequentially computable if, for every computable sequence $\{x_i\}_{i=1}^\infty$ of real numbers, the sequence $\{f(x_i) \}_{i=1}^\infty$ is also computable.

A function $f: \R \to \R$ is effectively uniformly continuous if there exists a primitive recursive function $d : \N \to \N$ such that, if $|x-y| < 1/d(n)$, then $|f(x) - f(y)| < 1/n$.

A real function is thus computable if it is both sequentially computable and effectively uniformly continuous.

These definitions can be generalized to functions of several variables as follows: let $D$ be a subset of $\R^n$. A function $f: D \to \R$ is sequentially computable if, for every $n$-tuple $( \{ x_{i \, 1} \}_{i=1}^\infty, \dots, \{ x_{i \, n} \}_{i=1}^\infty)$ of computable sequences of real numbers such that

$$(x_{i \, 1}, \ldots x_{i \, n}) \in D$$

for all $i$, the sequence $\{f(x_i) \}_{i=1}^\infty$ is also computable.
