= Moschovakis =

Moschovakis is a surname. Notable people with the surname include:

- Anna Moschovakis, American poet, author, and translator
- Joan Moschovakis (born 1937), American logician and mathematician
- Yiannis N. Moschovakis (born 1938), American logician
