= Indecomposability (intuitionistic logic) =

In intuitionistic analysis and in computable analysis, indecomposability or indivisibility (German: Unzerlegbarkeit, from the adjective unzerlegbar) is the principle that the continuum cannot be partitioned into two nonempty pieces. This principle was established by Brouwer in 1928 using intuitionistic principles, and can also be proven using Church's thesis. The analogous property in classical analysis is the fact that every continuous function from the continuum to {0,1} is constant.

It follows from the indecomposability principle that any property of real numbers that is decided (each real number either has or does not have that property) is in fact trivial (either all the real numbers have that property, or else none of them do). Conversely, if a property of real numbers is not trivial, then the property is not decided for all real numbers. This contradicts the law of the excluded middle, according to which every property of the real numbers is decided; so, since there are many nontrivial properties, there are many nontrivial partitions of the continuum.

In constructive set theory (CZF), it is consistent to assume the universe of all sets is indecomposable—so that any class for which membership is decided (every set is either a member of the class, or else not a member of the class) is either empty or the entire universe.

== See also ==
- Indecomposable continuum
