= Pseudo-order =

In constructive mathematics, pseudo-order is a name given to certain binary relations appropriate for modeling continuous orderings.

In classical mathematics, its axioms constitute a formulation of a strict total order (also called linear order), which in that context can also be defined in other, equivalent ways.

== Examples ==
The constructive theory of the real numbers is the prototypical example where the pseudo-order formulation becomes crucial. A real number is less than another if there exists (one can construct) a rational number greater than the former and less than the latter. In other words, here x < y holds if there exists a rational number z such that x < z < y. Notably, for the continuum in a constructive context, the usual trichotomy law does not hold, i.e. it is not automatically provable. The axioms in the characterization of orders like this are thus weaker (when working using just constructive logic) than alternative axioms of a strict total order, which are often employed in the classical context.

== Definition ==
A pseudo-order is a binary relation satisfying the three conditions:

- It is not possible for two elements to each be less than the other. That is, for all $x$ and $y$,

$$\neg(x < y \land y < x)$$

- Every two elements for which neither one is less than the other must be equal. That is, for all $x$ and $y$,

$$\neg(x < y \lor y < x) \to x = y$$

- For all x, y, and z, if x < y then either x < z or z < y. That is, for all $x$, $y$ and $z$,

$$x < y \to (x < z \lor z < y)$$

=== Auxiliary notation ===
There are common constructive reformulations making use of contrapositions and the valid equivalences $\neg(\phi\land\psi)\leftrightarrow(\phi\to\neg\psi)$ as well as $\neg(\phi\lor\psi)\leftrightarrow(\neg\phi\land\neg\psi)$. The negation of the pseudo-order $x<y$ of two elements defines a reflexive partial order $y\le x$. In these terms, the first condition reads

$$x<y\to x\le y$$

and it really just expresses the asymmetry of $x<y$. It implies irreflexivity, as familiar from the classical theory.

==== Classical equivalents to trichotomy ====
The second condition exactly expresses the anti-symmetry of the associated partial order,

$$(x \le y \land y \le x) \to x = y$$

With the above two reformulations, the negation signs may be hidden in the definition of a pseudo-order.

A natural apartness relation on a pseudo-ordered set is given by $x \# y := (x < y \lor y < x)$. With it, the second condition exactly states that this relation is tight,

$$\neg(x \# y) \to x = y$$

Together with the first axiom, this means equality can be expressed as negation of apartness. Note that the negation of equality is in general merely the double-negation of apartness.

Now the disjunctive syllogism may be expressed as $(\phi\lor\psi) \to (\neg\phi\to\psi)$. Such a logical implication can classically be reversed, and then this condition exactly expresses trichotomy. As such, it is also a formulation of connectedness.

== Discussion ==
=== Asymmetry ===
The non-contradiction principle for the partial order states that $\neg\big(x \le y \land \neg(x \le y))$ or equivalently $\neg\neg\big(x \le y \lor y < x)$, for all elements. Constructively, the validity of the double-negation exactly means that there cannot be a refutation of any of the disjunctions in the classical claim $\forall x. \forall y. \neg(y < x) \lor (y < x)$, whether or not this proposition represents a decidable problem.

Using the asymmetry condition, the above also implies $\neg\neg(x\le y\lor y\le x)$, the double-negated strong connectedness. In a classical logic context, "$\le$" thus constitutes a (non-strict) total order.

=== Co-transitivity ===
The contrapositive of the third condition exactly expresses that the associated relation $x\le y$ (the partial order) is transitive. So that property is called co-transitivity. Using the asymmetry condition, one quickly derives the theorem that a pseudo-order is actually transitive as well. Transitivity is common axiom in the classical definition of a linear order.

The condition also called is comparison (as well as weak linearity): For any nontrivial interval given by some $x$ and some $y$ above it, any third element $z$ is either above the lower bound or below the upper bound. Since this is an implication of a disjunction, it ties to the trichotomy law as well. And indeed, having a pseudo-order on a Dedekind-MacNeille-complete poset implies the principle of excluded middle. This impacts the discussion of completeness in the constructive theory of the real numbers.

==== Relation to other properties ====
This section assumes classical logic. At least then, following properties can be proven:

If R is a co-transitive relation, then

- R is also quasitransitive;
- R satisfies axiom 3 of semiorders; (Note: For symmetric R, semiorder axiom 3 even coincides with co-transitivity.)
- incomparability w.r.t. R is a transitive relation; (Note: Transitivity of incomparability is required e.g. for strict weak orderings.) and
- R is connex iff it is reflexive. (Note: unless the domain is a singleton set)

Sufficient conditions for a co-transitive relation R to be transitive also are:

- R is left Euclidean;
- R is right Euclidean;
- R is antisymmetric.

A semi-connex relation R is also co-transitive if it is symmetric, left or right Euclidean, transitive, or quasitransitive. If incomparability w.r.t. R is a transitive relation, then R is co-transitive if it is symmetric, left or right Euclidean, or transitive.

== See also ==
- Constructive analysis
- Indecomposability (intuitionistic logic)
- Linear order
