= Subcountability =

Mathematical property of sets

In constructive mathematics, a collection $X$ is subcountable if there exists a partial surjection from the natural numbers onto it. This may be expressed as
$$\exists (I\subseteq{\mathbb N}).\, \exists f.\, (f\colon I\twoheadrightarrow X),$$
where $f\colon I\twoheadrightarrow X$ denotes that $f$ is a surjective function from $I$ onto $X$. The surjection is a member of ${\mathbb N}\rightharpoonup X$ and here the subclass $I$ of ${\mathbb N}$ is required to be a set. In other words, all elements of a subcountable collection $X$ are functionally in the image of an indexing set of counting numbers $I\subseteq{\mathbb N}$ and thus the set $X$ can be understood as being dominated by the countable set ${\mathbb N}$.

== Discussion ==
=== Nomenclature ===
Note that nomenclature of countability and finiteness properties vary substantially - in part because many of them coincide when assuming excluded middle. To reiterate, the discussion here concerns the property defined in terms of surjections onto the set $X$ being characterized. The language here is common in constructive set theory texts, but the name subcountable has otherwise also been given to properties in terms of injections out of the set being characterized.

The set ${\mathbb N}$ in the definition can also be abstracted away, and in terms of the more general notion $X$ may be called a subquotient of ${\mathbb N}$.

=== Example ===
Important cases are those where the set in question is some subclass of a bigger class of functions as studied in computability theory. For context, recall that being total is famously not a decidable property of functions. Indeed, Rice's theorem on index sets, most domains of indices are, in fact, not computable sets.

There cannot be a computable surjection $n\mapsto f_n$ from ${\mathbb N}$ onto the set of total computable functions $X$, as demonstrated via the function $n\mapsto f_n(n)+1$ from the diagonal construction, which could never be in such a surjections image. However, via the codes of all possible partial computable functions, which also allows non-terminating programs, such subsets of functions, such as the total functions, are seen to be subcountable sets: The total functions are the range of some strict subset $I$ of the natural numbers. Being dominated by an uncomputable set of natural numbers, the name subcountable thus conveys that the set $X$ is no bigger than ${\mathbb N}$. At the same time, for some particular restrictive constructive semantics of function spaces, in cases when $I$ is provenly not computably enumerable, such $I$ is then also not countable, and the same holds for $X$.

Note that no effective map between all counting numbers ${\mathbb N}$ and the unbounded and non-finite indexing set $I$ is asserted in the definition of subcountability - merely the subset relation $I\subseteq{\mathbb N}$. A demonstration that $X$ is subcountable at the same time implies that it is classically (non-constructively) formally countable, but this does not reflect any effective countability. In other words, the fact that an algorithm listing all total functions in sequence cannot be coded up is not captured by classical axioms regarding set and function existence. We see that, depending on the axioms of a theory, subcountability may be more likely to be provable than countability.

=== Relation to excluded middle ===
In constructive logics and set theories tie the existence of a function between infinite (non-finite) sets to questions of decidability and possibly of effectivity. There, the subcountability property splits from countability and is thus not a redundant notion. The indexing set $I$ of natural numbers may be posited to exist, e.g. as a subset via set theoretical axioms like the separation axiom schema. Then by definition of $I\subseteq{\mathbb N}$,
$$\forall (i\in I). (i\in{\mathbb N}).$$
But this set may then still fail to be detachable, in the sense that
$$\forall (n\in {\mathbb N}). \big((n\in I) \lor \neg(n\in I)\big)$$
may not be provable without assuming it as an axiom. One may fail to effectively count the subcountable set $X$ if one fails to map the counting numbers ${\mathbb N}$ into the indexing set $I$, for this reason. Being countable implies being subcountable. In the appropriate context with Markov's principle, the converse is equivalent to the law of excluded middle, i.e. that for all proposition $\phi$ holds $\phi\lor \neg \phi$. In particular, constructively this converse direction does not generally hold.

==== In classical mathematics ====
Asserting all laws of classical logic, the disjunctive property of $I$ discussed above indeed does hold for all sets. Then, for nonempty $X$, the properties numerable (which here shall mean that $X$ injects into ${\mathbb N}$), countable (${\mathbb N}$ has $X$ as its range), subcountable (a subset of ${\mathbb N}$ surjects into $X$) and also not $\omega$-productive (a countability property essentially defined in terms of subsets of $X$) are all equivalent and express that a set is finite or countably infinite.

==== Non-classical assertions ====
Without the law of excluded middle, it can be consistent to assert the subcountability of sets that classically (i.e. non-constructively) exceed the cardinality of the natural numbers. Note that in a constructive setting, a countability claim about the function space ${\mathbb N}^{\mathbb N}$ out of the full set ${\mathbb N}$, as in ${\mathbb N}\twoheadrightarrow{\mathbb N}^{\mathbb N}$, may be disproven. But subcountability $I\twoheadrightarrow{\mathbb N}^{\mathbb N}$ of an uncountable set ${\mathbb N}^{\mathbb N}$ by a set $I\subseteq{\mathbb N}$ that is not effectively detachable from ${\mathbb N}$ may be permitted.

A constructive proof is also classically valid. If a set is proven uncountable constructively, then in a classical context is it provably not subcountable. As this applies to ${\mathbb N}^{\mathbb N}$, the classical framework with its large function space is incompatible with the constructive Church's thesis, an axiom of Russian constructivism.

=== Subcountable and ω-productive are mutually exclusive ===
A set $X$ shall be called $\omega$-productive if, whenever any of its subsets $W\subset X$ is the range of some partial function on ${\mathbb N}$, there always exists an element $d\in X\setminus W$ that remains in the complement of that range.

If there exists any surjection onto some $X$, then its corresponding compliment as described would equal the empty set $X\setminus X$, and so a subcountable set is never $\omega$-productive. As defined above, the property of being $\omega$-productive associates the range $W$ of any partial function to a particular value $d\in X$ not in the functions range, $d\notin W$. In this way, a set $X$ being $\omega$-productive speaks for how hard it is to generate all the elements of it: They cannot be generated from the naturals using a single function. The $\omega$-productivity property constitutes an obstruction to subcountability. As this also implies uncountability, diagonal arguments often involve this notion, explicitly since the late seventies.

One may establish the impossibility of computable enumerability of $X$ by considering only the computably enumerable subsets $W$ and one may require the set of all obstructing $d$'s to be the image of a total recursive so called production function.

${\mathbb N}\rightharpoonup X$ denotes the space that exactly hold all the partial functions on ${\mathbb N}$ that have, as their range, only subsets $W$ of $X$. In set theory, functions are modeled as collection of pairs. Whenever ${\mathcal P}{\mathbb N}$ is a set, the set of sets of pairs $\cup_{I\subseteq{\mathbb N}} X^I$ may be used to characterize the space of partial functions on ${\mathbb N}$. The for an $\omega$-productive set $X$ one finds

$$\forall (w\in({\mathbb N}\rightharpoonup X)). \exists (d\in X). \forall(n\in{\mathbb N}). w(n) \neq d.$$

Read constructively, this associates any partial function $w$ with an element $d$ not in that functions range. This property emphasizes the incompatibility of an $\omega$-productive set $X$ with any surjective (possibly partial) function. Below this is applied in the study of subcountability assumptions.

== Set theories ==
=== Cantorian arguments on subsets of the naturals ===
As reference theory we look at the constructive set theory CZF, which has Replacement, Bounded Separation, strong Infinity, is agnostic towards the existence of power sets, but includes the axiom that asserts that any function space $Y^X$ is set, given $X, Y$ are also sets. In this theory, it is moreover consistent to assert that every set is subcountable. The compatibility of various further axioms is discussed in this section by means of possible surjections on an infinite set of counting numbers $I\subseteq {\mathbb N}$. Here ${\mathbb N}$ shall denote a model of the standard natural numbers.

Recall that for functions $g\colon X\to Y$, by definition of total functionality, there exists a unique return value for all values $x\in X$ in the domain,

$$\exists!(y\in Y). g(x)=y,$$

and for a subcountable set, the surjection is still total on a subset of ${\mathbb N}$. Constructively, fewer such existential claims will be provable than classically.

The situations discussed below—onto power classes versus onto function spaces—are different from one another: Opposed to general subclass defining predicates and their truth values (not necessarily provably just true and false), a function (which in programming terms is terminating) does makes accessible information about data for all its subdomains (subsets of the $X$). When as characteristic functions for their subsets, functions, through their return values, decide subset membership. As membership in a generally defined set is not necessarily decidable, the (total) functions $X\to\{0,1\}$ are not automatically in bijection with all the subsets of $X$. So constructively, subsets are a more elaborate concept than characteristic functions. In fact, in the context of some non-classical axioms on top of CZF, even the power class of a singleton, e.g. the class ${\mathcal P}\{0\}$ of all subsets of $\{0\}$, is shown to be a proper class.

==== Onto power classes ====
Below, the fact is used that the special case $(P\to \neg P)\to\neg P$ of the negation introduction law implies that $P\leftrightarrow \neg P$ is contradictory.

For simplicitly of the argument, assume ${\mathcal P}{\mathbb N}$ is a set. Then consider a subset $I\subseteq{\mathbb N}$ and a function $w\colon I\to{\mathcal P}{\mathbb N}$. Further, as in Cantor's theorem about power sets, define
$$d=\{k \in {\mathbb N}\mid k\in I \land D(k)\}$$
where,
$$D(k)=\neg (k\in w(k)).$$
This is a subclass of ${\mathbb N}$ defined in dependency of $w$ and it can also be written
$$d=\{k \in I\mid \neg (k\in w(k))\}.$$
It exists as subset via Separation. Now assuming there exists a number $n\in I$ with $w(n)=d$ implies the contradiction
$$n\in d\,\leftrightarrow\,\neg(n\in d).$$
So as a set, one finds ${\mathcal P}{\mathbb N}$ is $\omega$-productive in that we can define an obstructing $d$ for any given surjection. Also note that the existence of a surjection $f\colon I\twoheadrightarrow{\mathcal P}{\mathbb N}$ would automatically make ${\mathcal P}{\mathbb N}$ into a set, via Replacement in CZF, and so this function existence is unconditionally impossible.

We conclude that the subcountability axiom, asserting all sets are subcountable, is incompatible with ${\mathcal P}{\mathbb N}$ being a set, as implied e.g. by the power set axiom.

Following the above prove makes it clear that we cannot map $I$ onto just ${\mathcal P}I$ either. Bounded separation indeed implies that no set $X$ whatsoever maps onto ${\mathcal P}X$.

Relatedly, for any function $h\colon{\mathcal P}Y\to Y$, a similar analysis using the subset of its range $\{y\in Y\mid \exists(S\in{\mathcal P}Y). y=h(S)\land y\notin S\}$ shows that $h$ cannot be an injection. The situation is more complicated for function spaces.

In classical ZFC without Powerset or any of its equivalents, it is also consistent that all subclasses of the reals which are sets are subcountable. In that context, this translates to the statement that all sets of real numbers are countable. Of course, that theory does not have the function space set ${\mathbb N}^{\mathbb N}$.

==== Onto function spaces ====
By definition of function spaces, the set ${\mathbb N}^{\mathbb N}$ holds those subsets of the set ${\mathbb N}\times{\mathbb N}$ which are provably total and functional. Asserting the permitted subcountability of all sets turns, in particular, ${\mathbb N}^{\mathbb N}$ into a subcountable set.

So here we consider a surjective function $f\colon I\twoheadrightarrow{\mathbb N}^{\mathbb N}$ and the subset of ${\mathbb N}\times{\mathbb N}$ separated as
$$\Big\{\langle n, y\rangle \in {\mathbb N}\times{\mathbb N} \mid \big(n\in I\land D(n, y)\big) \lor \big(\neg(n\in I)\land y=1\big)\Big\}$$
with the diagonalizing predicate defined as
$$D(n, y) = \big(\neg(f(n)(n)\ge 1)\land y=1\big) \lor \big(\neg(f(n)(n)=0)\land y=0\big)$$
which we can also phrase without the negations as
$$D(n, y) = \big(f(n)(n)=0\land y=1\big) \lor \big(f(n)(n)\ge 1\land y=0\big).$$
This set is classically provably a function in ${\mathbb N}^{\mathbb N}$, designed to take the value $y=0$ for particular inputs $n$. And it can classically be used to prove that the existence of $f$ as a surjection is actually contradictory. However, constructively, unless the proposition $n\in I$ in its definition is decidable so that the set actually defined a functional assignment, we cannot prove this set to be a member of the function space. And so we just cannot draw the classical conclusion.

In this fashion, subcountability of ${\mathbb N}^{\mathbb N}$ is permitted, and indeed models of the theory exist. Nevertheless, also in the case of CZF, the existence of a full surjection ${\mathbb N}\twoheadrightarrow{\mathbb N}^{\mathbb N}$, with domain ${\mathbb N}$, is indeed contradictory. The decidable membership of $I={\mathbb N}$ makes the set also not countable, i.e. uncountable.

Beyond these observations, also note that for any non-zero number $a$, the functions $i\mapsto f(i)(i)+a$ in $I\to{\mathbb N}$ involving the surjection $f$ cannot be extended to all of ${\mathbb N}$ by a similar contradiction argument. This can be expressed as saying that there are then partial functions that cannot be extended to full functions in ${\mathbb N}\to{\mathbb N}$. Note that when given a $n\in{\mathbb N}$, one cannot necessarily decide whether $n\in I$, and so one cannot even decide whether the value of a potential function extension on $n$ is already determined for the previously characterized surjection $f$.

The subcountibility axiom, asserting all sets are subcountable, is incompatible with any new axiom making $I$ countable, including LEM.

=== Models ===
The above analysis affects formal properties of codings of $\mathbb R$. Models for the non-classical extension of CZF theory by subcountability postulates have been constructed. Such non-constructive axioms can be seen as choice principles which, however, do not tend to increase the proof-theoretical strengths of the theories much.

- There are models of IZF in which all sets with apartness relations are subcountable.
- CZF has a model in, for example, the Martin-Löf type theory ${\mathsf {ML_1V}}$. In this constructive set theory with classically uncountable function spaces, it is indeed consistent to assert the Subcountability Axiom, saying that every set is subcountable. As discussed, the resulting theory is in contradiction to the axiom of power set and with the law of excluded middle.
- More stronger yet, some models of Kripke–Platek set theory, a theory without the function space postulate, even validate that all sets are countable.

=== The notion of size ===
Subcountability as judgement of small size shall not be conflated with the standard mathematical definition of cardinality relations as defined by Cantor, with smaller cardinality being defined in terms of injections and equality of cardinalities being defined in terms of bijections. Constructively, the preorder "$\le$" on the class of sets fails to be decidable and anti-symmetric. The function space ${\mathbb N}^{\mathbb N}$ (and also $\{0,1\}^{\mathbb N}$) in a moderately rich set theory is always found to be neither finite nor in bijection with ${\mathbb N}$, by Cantor's diagonal argument. This is what it means to be uncountable. But the argument that the cardinality of that set would thus in some sense exceed that of the natural numbers relies on a restriction to just the classical size conception and its induced ordering of sets by cardinality.

As seen in the example of the function space considered in computability theory, not every infinite subset of ${\mathbb N}$ necessarily is in constructive bijection with ${\mathbb N}$, thus making room for a more refined distinction between uncountable sets in constructive contexts. Motivated by the above sections, the infinite set ${\mathbb N}^{\mathbb N}$ may be considered "smaller" than the class ${\mathcal P}{\mathbb N}$.

== Related properties ==
A subcountable set has alternatively also been called subcountably indexed. The analogous notion exists in which "$\exists(I\subseteq{\mathbb N})$" in the definition is replaced by the existence of a set that is a subset of some finite set. This property is variously called subfinitely indexed.

In category theory all these notions are subquotients.

== See also ==
- Cantor's diagonal argument
- Computable function
- Constructive set theory
- Schröder–Bernstein theorem
- Subquotient
- Total order
