= Joan Moschovakis =

American logician and mathematician

Joan R. Moschovakis
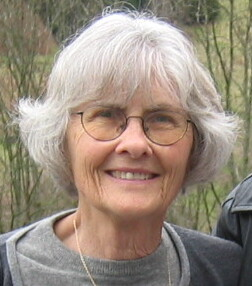
- Moschovakis in 2008
- Born: Joan Rand; 1937 (age 88–89)
- Education: University of California–Berkeley University of Wisconsin–Madison
- Known for: Intuitionistic mathematics, Intuitionistic logic
- Scientific career
- Fields: Mathematics
- Workplaces: Occidental College
- Doctoral advisor: Stephen Kleene

Joan Rand Moschovakis is a logician and mathematician focusing on intuitionistic logic and mathematics. She is professor emerita at Occidental College and a guest at UCLA.

Moschovakis earned her PhD from the University of Wisconsin–Madison in 1965 under the direction of Stephen Kleene, with a dissertation titled Disjunction, Existence and *-Eliminability in Formalized Intuitionistic Analysis.

Moschovakis is married to Yiannis Moschovakis, with whom she gave the 2014 Lindström Lectures at the University of Gothenburg.

== Selected publications ==
- Moschovakis, Joan (2015). "Intuitionistic logic". In Zalta, Edward N. (ed.). Stanford Encyclopedia of Philosophy. ISSN 1095-5054. OCLC 429049174.
- Moschovakis, Joan Rand (2009). "The logic of Brouwer and Heyting". In Gabbay, Dov M.; Woods, John (eds.). Handbook of the History of Logic. Vol. 5. Logic from Russell to Church. Handbook of the History of Logic. Vol. 5. Amsterdam: Elsevier/North-Holland. pp. 77–125. doi:10.1016/S1874-5857(09)70007-X. ISBN 9780444516206. MR 2668177.
- Moschovakis, Joan Rand (1987). "Relative lawlessness in intuitionistic analysis". Journal of Symbolic Logic. 52 (1): 68–88. doi:10.2307/2273863. JSTOR 2273863. MR 0877856.
- Moschovakis, Joan Rand (1971). "Can there be no nonrecursive functions?". Journal of Symbolic Logic. 36 (2): 309–315. doi:10.2307/2270266. JSTOR 2270266. MR 0294087.
