= Modulus of convergence =

Mathematical term

In real analysis, a branch of mathematics, a modulus of convergence is a function that tells how quickly a convergent sequence converges. These moduli are often employed in the study of computable analysis and constructive mathematics.

If a sequence of real numbers $x_i$ converges to a real number $x$, then by definition, for every real $\varepsilon > 0$ there is a natural number $N$ such that if $i > N$ then $\left|x - x_i\right| < \varepsilon$. A modulus of convergence is essentially a function that, given $\varepsilon$, returns a corresponding value of $N$.

== Examples ==
Suppose that $x_i$ is a convergent sequence of real numbers with limit $x$. There are two common ways of defining a modulus of convergence as a function from natural numbers to natural numbers:

- As a function $f$ such that for all $n$, if $i > f(n)$ then $\left|x - x_i\right| < 1/n$.
- As a function $g$ such that for all $n$, if $i \geq j > g(n)$ then $\left|x_i - x_j\right| < 1/n$.

The latter definition is often employed in constructive settings, where the limit $x$ may actually be identified with the convergent sequence. Some authors use an alternate definition that replaces $1/n$ with $2^{-n}$.

== See also ==
- Modulus of continuity
