= Stanley Tennenbaum =

American mathematician

- Born: 1927 or 1928
- Died: May 4, 2006; Princeton, New Jersey, U.S.

Academic background
- Education: University of Chicago

Academic work
- Discipline: Mathematics
- Sub-discipline: Mathematical logic
- Institutions: University of Pennsylvania; University of Rochester; New Mexico State University

Stanley Tennenbaum (1927/28 – May 4, 2005) was an American mathematical logician. Though best remembered for Tennenbaum's theorem, despite having never published a proof of it, Tennenbaum had also studied Suslin's problem and computably enumerable sets.

Over his academic career in the 1960s and 1970s, he switched between several U.S. institutions; namely, in order, the University of Michigan, the University of Pennsylvania, the University of Rochester, the Institute for Advanced Study, and New Mexico State University.

== Biography ==
=== Early life and education (1927–1956) ===
Tennenbaum grew up in Cincinnati, Ohio. Though he rarely spoke about his childhood later in life, he had had one sister, born about the same time as he was, and he had played football in high school.

At age 16, Tennenbaum entered the University of Chicago as an undergrad; he received his PhD from the same university in 1956. He also spent a few months as one of the counselors for "Bettelheim's Orthogenic School", a school, also located in the city of Chicago, Illinois, which served autistic and schizophrenic children. In the fall of 1953, Tennenbaum briefly squared off with Paul Halmos, who was teaching at the time about the connection between Godel's completeness theorem and cylindrical algebras, accusing the latter of "destroy[ing] logic by subsuming it into ordinary mathematics" and "being egged on by Saunders Mac Lane".

=== Research career (1956–1972) ===
As a mathematician, Tennenbaum lived an itinerant lifestyle. As of 1961, he had a research scholarship from the University of Michigan Department of Mathematics. Later on, he became a visiting professor of philosophy at the University of Pennsylvania as of 1964. He then went on to teach at the University of Rochester, his only ever permanent position. Resigning after he spat on the shoes of the university's president during a faculty meeting, he continued to live in the same city of Rochester, New York thereafter. At both universities, he became a staunch friend of fellow mathematician Melvyn B. Nathanson. He was a member of the Institute for Advanced Study School of Mathematics from January to June 1967, and five years later he was a visitor to the same school from May to August 1972. Tennenbaum had also spent much of his life thinking about possibly solving the Riemann hypothesis. He was good friends with André Weil, jokingly referring to Weil (whose surname was pronounced "Vey") as "Mr. Oy Vey".

=== Decline and death (1972–2005) ===
By 1972, Tennenbaum's health was in decline. His finances were worsening, he was showing signs of schizophrenia, and he had been using pot. In the 1970s, Tennenbaum was affiliated with New Mexico State University, and he had taught a popular seminar on constructive mathematics there.

Around the spring of 1991, Tennenbaum had showed up at the University of Illinois Chicago campus while Bill Howard, one of Tennenbaum's friends, had been teaching a class titled "Finite Math for Business Students", during which some students left and one had dropped a bottle. After the class, Tennenbaum told Howard that the class was bad for the latter's mental health.

Tennenbaum died in 2005, aged 78, sitting on a chair in Princeton, New Jersey with a phone in his hand.

== Research ==
Sometime in the 1950s, Tennenbaum discovered a short proof of the irrationality of the square root of 2, which was later republished in the 2006 book Power. Namely, if two red squares of minimal integer sidelength could equal a larger white square of integer sidelength, by putting both red squares inside the white square and double counting, the doubly counted part (a square) must be equal in area to the uncounted part (two even smaller squares). This contradicts the minimality assumption.

In the June 1959 issue of Notices of the American Mathematical Society, Tennenbaum wrote in an abstract, without proof, that no countable nonstandard model of Peano arithmetic (PA) can be recursive. Although Tennenbaum himself never gave a proof, this theorem would later become known as Tennenbaum's theorem. In the same abstract, Tennenbaum also wrote, without proof, that if a set is representable by a first-order formula in a countable nonstandard model of PA, then the Turing degree of that set is at most the Turing degree of the operations of said model. As a corollary, citing work of Feferman, Tennenbaum also wrote that there is no arithmetically definable model for all true sentences of arithmetic.

In 1962, Tennenbaum proved that the function which enumerates the complement of any maximal recursively enumerable set must grow faster than any general recursive function.

In 1963, Tennenbaum proved the relative consistency of the negation of Suslin's hypothesis by applying an early version of forcing; the same result was independently proven by Thomas Jech in 1967 using the method of nabla-models introduced by Petr Vopěnka. Later, in 1965, Tennenbaum and Robert Solovay proved the relative consistency of Suslin's hypothesis.

== Legacy ==
A conference was held in his honor at the City University of New York on April 7, 2006. He had also had one daughter, Susan.
