= Robinson arithmetic =

Axiomatic logical system

In mathematics, Robinson arithmetic is a finitely axiomatized fragment of first-order Peano arithmetic (PA), first set out by Raphael M. Robinson in 1950. It is usually denoted Q.

Q is PA without the axiom schema of mathematical induction. Q is weaker than PA but it has the same language, and both theories are incomplete. Q is important and interesting because it is a finitely axiomatized fragment of PA that is recursively incompletable and essentially undecidable.

== Axioms ==
The background logic of Q is first-order logic with identity, denoted by infix '='. The individuals, called natural numbers, are members of a set called N with a distinguished member 0, called zero. There are three operations over N:

- A unary operation called successor and denoted by prefix S;
- Two binary operations, addition and multiplication, denoted by infix + and ·, respectively.

The following axioms for Q are Q1–Q7 in Burgess (2005, p. 42) (cf. also the axioms of first-order arithmetic). Variables not bound by an existential quantifier are bound by an implicit universal quantifier.

1. Sx ≠ 0
  - 0 is not the successor of any number.
2. (Sx = Sy) → x = y
  - If the successor of x is identical to the successor of y, then x and y are identical. (1) and (2) yield the minimum of facts about N (it is an infinite set bounded by 0) and S (it is an injective function whose domain is N) needed for non-triviality. The converse of (2) follows from the properties of identity.
3. y=0 ∨ ∃x (Sx = y)
  - Every number is either 0 or the successor of some number. The axiom schema of mathematical induction present in arithmetics stronger than Q turns this axiom into a theorem.
4. x + 0 = x
5. x + Sy = S(x + y)
  - (4) and (5) are the recursive definition of addition.
6. x·0 = 0
7. x·Sy = (x·y) + x
  - (6) and (7) are the recursive definition of multiplication.

=== Variant axiomatizations ===
The axioms in Robinson (1950) are (1)–(13) in Mendelson (2015, pp. 202–203). The first 6 of Robinson's 13 axioms are required only when, unlike here, the background logic does not include identity.

The usual strict total order on N, "less than" (denoted by "<"), can be defined in terms of addition via the rule x < y ↔ ∃z (Sz + x = y). Equivalently, we get a definitional conservative extension of Q by taking "<" as primitive and adding this rule as an eighth axiom; this system is termed "Robinson arithmetic R" in Boolos, Burgess & Jeffrey (2002, Sec 16.4).

A different extension of Q, which we temporarily call Q+, is obtained if we take "<" as primitive and add (instead of the last definitional axiom) the following three axioms to axioms (1)–(7) of Q:

- ¬(x < 0)
- x < Sy ↔ (x < y ∨ x = y)
- x < y ∨ x = y ∨ y < x

Q+ is still a conservative extension of Q, in the sense that any formula provable in Q+ not containing the symbol "<" is already provable in Q. (Adding only the first two of the above three axioms to Q gives a conservative extension of Q that is equivalent to what Burgess (2005, p. 56) calls Q*. See also Burgess (2005, p. 230, fn. 24), but note that the second of the above three axioms cannot be deduced from "the pure definitional extension" of Q obtained by adding only the axiom x < y ↔ ∃z (Sz + x = y).)

Among the axioms (1)–(7) of Q, axiom (3) needs an inner existential quantifier. Shoenfield (1967, p. 22) gives an axiomatization that has only (implicit) outer universal quantifiers, by dispensing with axiom (3) of Q but adding the above three axioms with < as primitive. That is, Shoenfield's system is Q+ minus axiom (3), and is strictly weaker than Q+, since axiom (3) is independent of the other axioms (for example, the ordinals less than $\omega^\omega$ forms a model for all axioms except (3) when Sv is interpreted as v + 1). Shoenfield's system also appears in Boolos, Burgess & Jeffrey (2002, Sec 16.2), where it is called the "minimal arithmetic" (also denoted by Q). A closely related axiomatization, that uses "≤" instead of "<", may be found in Machover (1996, pp. 256–257).

== Metamathematics ==
On the metamathematics of Q see Boolos, Burgess & Jeffrey (2002, chpt. 16), Tarski, Mostowski & Robinson (1953), Smullyan (1991), Mendelson (2015, pp. 202–203) and Burgess (2005, §§1.5a, 2.2). The intended interpretation of Q is the natural numbers and their usual arithmetic in which addition and multiplication have their customary meaning, identity is equality, Sx = x + 1, and 0 is the natural number zero.

Any model (structure) that satisfies all axioms of Q except possibly axiom (3) has a unique submodel ("the standard part") isomorphic to the standard natural numbers (N, +, ·, S, 0). (Axiom (3) need not be satisfied; for example the polynomials with non-negative integer coefficients forms a model that satisfies all axioms except (3).)

Q, like Peano arithmetic, has nonstandard models of all infinite cardinalities. However, unlike Peano arithmetic, Tennenbaum's theorem does not apply to Q, and it has computable non-standard models. For instance, there is a computable model of Q consisting of integer-coefficient polynomials with positive leading coefficient, plus the zero polynomial, with their usual arithmetic.

A notable characteristic of Q is the absence of the axiom scheme of induction. Hence it is often possible to prove in Q every specific instance of a fact about the natural numbers, but not the associated general theorem. For example, 5 + 7 = 7 + 5 is provable in Q, but the general statement x + y = y + x is not. Similarly, one cannot prove the general statement Sx ≠ x. A model of Q that fails many of the standard facts is obtained by adjoining two distinct new elements a and b to the standard model of natural numbers and defining Sa = a, Sb = b, x + a = b and x + b = a for all x, a + n = a and b + n = b if n is a standard natural number, x·0 = 0 for all x, a·n = b and b·n = a if n is a non-zero standard natural number, x·a = a for all x except x = a, x·b = b for all x except x = b, a·a = b, and b·b = a.

Q is interpretable in a fragment of Zermelo's axiomatic set theory, consisting of extensionality, existence of the empty set, and the axiom of adjunction. This theory is S' in Tarski, Mostowski & Robinson (1953, p. 34) and ST in Burgess (2005, pp. 90–91, 223). See general set theory for more details.

Q is a finitely axiomatized first-order theory that is considerably weaker than Peano arithmetic (PA), and whose axioms contain only one existential quantifier. Yet like PA it is incomplete and incompletable in the sense of Gödel's incompleteness theorems, and essentially undecidable. Robinson (1950) derived the Q axioms (1)–(7) above by noting just what PA axioms are required to prove that every computable function is representable in PA. The only use this proof makes of the PA axiom schema of induction is to prove a statement that is axiom (3) above, and so, all computable functions are representable in Q. The conclusion of Gödel's second incompleteness theorem also holds for Q: no consistent recursively axiomatized extension of Q can prove its own consistency, even if we additionally restrict Gödel numbers of proofs to a definable cut.

The first incompleteness theorem applies only to axiomatic systems defining sufficient arithmetic to carry out the necessary coding constructions (of which Gödel numbering forms a part). The axioms of Q were chosen specifically to ensure they are strong enough for this purpose. Thus the usual proof of the first incompleteness theorem can be used to show that Q is incomplete and undecidable. This indicates that the incompleteness and undecidability of PA cannot be blamed on the only aspect of PA differentiating it from Q, namely the axiom schema of induction.

Gödel's theorems do not hold when any one of the seven axioms above is dropped. These fragments of Q remain undecidable, but they are no longer essentially undecidable: they have consistent decidable extensions, as well as uninteresting models (i.e., models that are not end-extensions of the standard natural numbers).

== See also ==
- Gentzen's consistency proof
- Gödel's incompleteness theorems
- List of first-order theories
- Peano axioms
- Presburger arithmetic
- Skolem arithmetic
- Second-order arithmetic
- Set-theoretic definition of natural numbers
- General set theory

== Bibliography ==
- Bezboruah, A.; Shepherdson, John C. (June 1976). "Gödel's Second Incompleteness Theorem for Q". Journal of Symbolic Logic. 41 (2): 503–512. doi:10.2307/2272251. JSTOR 2272251.
- Boolos, George; Burgess, John P.; Jeffrey, Richard (2002). Computability and Logic (4th ed.). Cambridge University Press. ISBN 0-521-00758-5.
- Burgess, John P. (July 2005). Fixing Frege. Princeton University Press. ISBN 978-0691122311.
- Hájek, Petr; Pudlák, Pavel (1993). Metamathematics of first-order arithmetic (2nd ed.). Springer-Verlag.
- Jones, James P.; Shepherdson, John C. (1983). "Variants of Robinson's essentially undecidable theoryR". Archiv für mathematische Logik und Grundlagenforschung. 23: 61–64. doi:10.1007/BF02023013. S2CID 2659126.
- Lucas, John R. Conceptual Roots of Mathematics. Routledge.
- Machover, Moshé (1996). Set Theory, Logic, and Their Limitation. Cambridge University Press.
- Mendelson, Elliott (2015). Introduction to Mathematical Logic (6th ed.). Chapman & Hall. ISBN 9781482237726.
- Odifreddi, Piergiorgio (1989). Classical recursion theory, Vol. 1 (The Theory of Functions and Sets of Natural Numbers). Studies in Logic and the Foundations of Mathematics. Vol. 125. North-Holland. ISBN 9780444894830.
- Pudlák, Pavel (June 1985). "Cuts, consistency statements and interpretations". Journal of Symbolic Logic. 50 (2): 423–441. doi:10.2307/2274231. JSTOR 2274231. S2CID 30289163.
- Rautenberg, Wolfgang (2010). A Concise Introduction to Mathematical Logic (3rd ed.). New York: Springer Science+Business Media. doi:10.1007/978-1-4419-1221-3. ISBN 978-1-4419-1220-6..
- Robinson, Raphael M. (1950). "An Essentially Undecidable Axiom System". Proceedings of the International Congress of Mathematicians. pp. 729–730. LCCN 52001808.
- Shoenfield, Joseph R. (1967). Mathematical logic. Addison Wesley. (Reprinted by Association for Symbolic Logic and A K Peters in 2000).
- Smullyan, Raymond (1991). Gödel's Incompleteness Theorems. Oxford University Press.
- Tarski, Alfred; Mostowski, Andrzej; Robinson, Raphael M. (1953). Undecidable theories. North Holland.
- Tourlakis, George (2022). Computability. Cham, Switzerland: Springer. ISBN 978-3-030-83202-5.
- Vaught, Robert L. (1966). "On a Theorem of Cobham Concerning Undecidable Theories". Logic, Methodology and Philosophy of Science: Proceedings of the 1960 International Congress. Studies in Logic and the Foundations of Mathematics. Vol. 44. North-Holland Publishing Company. pp. 14–25. doi:10.1016/S0049-237X(09)70566-X. ISBN 9780804700962.
