= Imaginary element =

In model theory, a branch of mathematics, an imaginary element of a structure is roughly a definable equivalence class. These were introduced by Shelah (1990), and elimination of imaginaries was introduced by Poizat (1983).

== Definitions ==
- M is a model of some theory.
- x and y stand for n-tuples of variables, for some natural number n.
- An equivalence formula is a formula φ(x, y) that is a symmetric and transitive relation. Its domain is the set of elements a of M^{n} such that φ(a, a); it is an equivalence relation on its domain.
- An imaginary element a/φ of M is an equivalence formula φ together with an equivalence class a.
- M has elimination of imaginaries if for every imaginary element a/φ there is a formula θ(x, y) such that there is a unique tuple b so that the equivalence class of a consists of the tuples x such that θ(x, b).
- A model has uniform elimination of imaginaries if the formula θ can be chosen independently of a.
- A theory has elimination of imaginaries if every model of that theory does (and similarly for uniform elimination).

== Examples ==
- ZFC set theory has elimination of imaginaries.
- Peano arithmetic has uniform elimination of imaginaries.
- A vector space of dimension at least 2 over a finite field with at least 3 elements does not have elimination of imaginaries.
