= Gödel's completeness theorem =

Fundamental theorem in mathematical logic

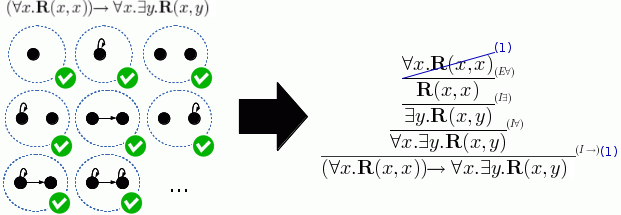
The formula (∀x. R(x,x)) → (∀x∃y. R(x,y)) holds in all structures (only the simplest 8 are shown left). By Gödel's completeness result, it must hence have a natural deduction proof (shown right).

Gödel's completeness theorem is a fundamental theorem in mathematical logic that establishes a correspondence between semantic truth and syntactic provability in first-order logic.

The completeness theorem applies to any first-order theory: If T is such a theory, and φ is a sentence (in the same language) and every model of T is a model of φ, then there is a (first-order) proof of φ using the statements of T as axioms. One sometimes says this as "anything true in all models is provable". (This does not contradict Gödel's incompleteness theorem, which is about a formula φ_{u} that is unprovable in a certain theory T but true in the "standard" model of the natural numbers: φ_{u} is false in some other, "non-standard" models of T.)

The completeness theorem makes a close link between model theory, which deals with what is true in different models, and proof theory, which studies what can be formally proven in particular formal systems.

It was first proved by Kurt Gödel in 1929. It was then simplified when Leon Henkin observed in his Ph.D. thesis that the hard part of the proof can be presented as the Model Existence Theorem (published in 1949). Henkin's proof was simplified by Gisbert Hasenjaeger in 1953.

== Preliminaries ==
There are numerous deductive systems for first-order logic, including systems of natural deduction and Hilbert-style systems. Common to all deductive systems is the notion of a formal deduction. This is a sequence (or, in some cases, a finite tree) of formulae with a specially designated conclusion. The definition of a deduction is such that it is finite and that it is possible to verify algorithmically (by a computer, for example, or by hand) that a given sequence (or tree) of formulae is indeed a deduction.

A first-order formula is called logically valid if it is true in every structure for the language of the formula (i.e. for any assignment of values to the variables of the formula). To formally state, and then prove, the completeness theorem, it is necessary to also define a deductive system. A deductive system is called complete if every logically valid formula is the conclusion of some formal deduction, and the completeness theorem for a particular deductive system is the theorem that it is complete in this sense. Thus, in a sense, there is a different completeness theorem for each deductive system. A converse to completeness is soundness, the fact that only logically valid formulas are provable in the deductive system.

If some specific deductive system of first-order logic is sound and complete, then it is "perfect" (a formula is provable if and only if it is logically valid), thus equivalent to any other deductive system with the same quality (any proof in one system can be converted into the other).

== Statement ==
We first fix a deductive system of first-order predicate calculus, choosing any of the well-known equivalent systems. Gödel's original proof assumed the Hilbert–Ackermann proof system.

=== Gödel's original formulation ===
The completeness theorem says that if a formula is logically valid then there is a finite deduction (a formal proof) of the formula.

Thus, the deductive system is "complete" in the sense that no additional inference rules are required to prove all the logically valid formulae. A converse to completeness is soundness, the fact that only logically valid formulae are provable in the deductive system. Together with soundness (whose verification is easy), this theorem implies that a formula is logically valid if and only if it is the conclusion of a formal deduction.

=== More general form ===
The theorem can be expressed more generally in terms of logical consequence. We say that a sentence s is a syntactic consequence of a theory T, denoted $T\vdash s$, if s is provable from T in our deductive system. We say that s is a semantic consequence of T, denoted $T\models s$, if s holds in every model of T. The completeness theorem then says that for any first-order theory T with a well-orderable language, and any sentence s in the language of T,

if $T\models s$, then $T\vdash s$.

Since the converse (soundness) also holds, it follows that $T\models s$ if and only if $T\vdash s$, and thus that syntactic and semantic consequence are equivalent for first-order logic.

This more general theorem is used implicitly, for example, when a sentence is shown to be provable from the axioms of group theory by considering an arbitrary group and showing that the sentence is satisfied by that group.

Gödel's original formulation is deduced by taking the particular case of a theory without any axioms.

=== Model existence theorem ===
The completeness theorem can also be understood in terms of consistency, as a consequence of Henkin's model existence theorem. We say that a theory T is syntactically consistent if there is no sentence s such that both s and its negation ¬s are provable from T in our deductive system. The model existence theorem says that for any first-order theory T with a well-orderable language,

if $T$ is syntactically consistent, then $T$ has a model.

Another version, with connections to the Löwenheim–Skolem theorem, says:

Every syntactically consistent, countable first-order theory has a finite or countable model.

Given Henkin's theorem, the completeness theorem can be proved as follows: If $T \models s$, then $T\cup\lnot s$ does not have models. By the contrapositive of Henkin's theorem, then $T\cup\lnot s$ is syntactically inconsistent. So a contradiction ($\bot$) is provable from $T\cup\lnot s$ in the deductive system. Hence $(T\cup\lnot s) \vdash \bot$, and then by the properties of the deductive system, $T\vdash s$.

=== As a theorem of arithmetic ===
The model existence theorem and its proof can be formalized in the framework of Peano arithmetic. Precisely, we can systematically define a model of any consistent computably axiomatisable first-order theory T in Peano arithmetic by interpreting each symbol of T by an arithmetical formula whose free variables are the arguments of the symbol. (In many cases, we will need to assume, as a hypothesis of the construction, that T is consistent, since Peano arithmetic may not prove that fact.) However, the definition expressed by this formula is not recursive (but is, in general, Δ_{2}).

== Consequences ==
An important consequence of the completeness theorem is that it is possible to computably enumerate the semantic consequences of any computably enumerable first-order theory, by enumerating all the possible formal deductions from the axioms of the theory, and use this to produce an enumeration of their conclusions.

This comes in contrast with the direct meaning of the notion of semantic consequence, that quantifies over all structures in a particular language, which is clearly not a recursive definition.

Also, it makes the concept of "provability", and thus of "theorem", a clear concept that only depends on the chosen system of axioms of the theory, and not on the choice of a proof system.

== Relationship to the incompleteness theorems ==
Gödel's incompleteness theorems show that there are inherent limitations to what can be proven within any given first-order theory in mathematics. The "incompleteness" in their name refers to another meaning of complete (see Gödel's incompleteness theorems – Completeness): A theory $T$ is complete (or decidable) if every sentence $S$ in the language of $T$ is either provable ($T\vdash S$) or disprovable ($T\vdash \neg S$).

The first incompleteness theorem states that any $T$ that is consistent, computably enumerable and contains Robinson arithmetic ("Q") must be incomplete in this sense, by explicitly constructing a sentence $S_T$ that is demonstrably neither provable nor disprovable within $T$. The second incompleteness theorem extends this result by showing that $S_T$ can be chosen so that it expresses the consistency of $T$ itself.

Since $S_T$ cannot be proven in $T$, the completeness theorem implies the existence of a model of $T$ in which $S_T$ is false. In fact, $S_T$ is a Π_{1} sentence, i.e. it states that some finitistic property is true of all natural numbers; so if it is false in a model, then one of the model's natural numbers is a counterexample. If this counterexample existed within the standard natural numbers, its existence would disprove $S_T$ within $T$; but the incompleteness theorem showed this to be impossible, so the counterexample must not be a standard number, and thus any model of $T$ in which $S_T$ is false must include non-standard numbers.

In fact, the model of any theory containing Q obtained by the systematic construction of the arithmetical model existence theorem, is always non-standard with a non-equivalent provability predicate and a non-equivalent way to interpret its own construction, so that this construction is non-recursive (as recursive definitions would be unambiguous).

Also, if $T$ is at least slightly stronger than Q (e.g. if it includes induction for bounded existential formulas), then Tennenbaum's theorem shows that it has no recursive non-standard models.

== Relationship to the compactness theorem ==
The completeness theorem and the compactness theorem are two cornerstones of first-order logic. While neither of these theorems can be proven in a completely effective manner, each one can be effectively obtained from the other.

The compactness theorem says that if a formula φ is a logical consequence of a (possibly infinite) set of formulas Γ then it is a logical consequence of a finite subset of Γ. This is an immediate consequence of the completeness theorem, because only a finite number of axioms from Γ can be mentioned in a formal deduction of φ, and the soundness of the deductive system then implies φ is a logical consequence of this finite set. This proof of the compactness theorem is originally due to Gödel.

Conversely, for many deductive systems, it is possible to prove the completeness theorem as an effective consequence of the compactness theorem.

The ineffectiveness of the completeness theorem can be measured along the lines of reverse mathematics. When considered over a countable language, the completeness and compactness theorems are equivalent to each other and equivalent to a weak form of choice known as weak Kőnig's lemma, with the equivalence provable in RCA_{0} (a second-order variant of Peano arithmetic restricted to induction over Σ^{0}_{1} formulas). Weak Kőnig's lemma is provable in ZF, the system of Zermelo–Fraenkel set theory without axiom of choice, and thus the completeness and compactness theorems for countable languages are provable in ZF. However the situation is different when the language is of arbitrary large cardinality since then, though the completeness and compactness theorems remain provably equivalent to each other in ZF, they are also provably equivalent to a weak form of the axiom of choice known as the ultrafilter lemma. In particular, no theory extending ZF can prove either the completeness or compactness theorems over arbitrary (possibly uncountable) languages without also proving the ultrafilter lemma on a set of the same cardinality.

== Completeness in other logics ==
The completeness theorem is a central property of first-order logic that does not hold for all logics. Second-order logic, for example, does not have a completeness theorem for its standard semantics (though does have the completeness property for Henkin semantics), and the set of logically valid formulas in second-order logic is not recursively enumerable. The same is true of all higher-order logics. It is possible to produce sound deductive systems for higher-order logics, but no such system can be complete.

Lindström's theorem states that first-order logic is the strongest (subject to certain constraints) logic satisfying both compactness and completeness.

A completeness theorem can be proved for modal logic or intuitionistic logic with respect to Kripke semantics.

== Proofs ==
Gödel's original proof of the theorem proceeded by reducing the problem to a special case for formulas in a certain syntactic form, and then handling this form with an ad hoc argument.

In modern logic texts, Gödel's completeness theorem is usually proved with Henkin's proof, rather than with Gödel's original proof. Henkin's proof is often presented with the following steps:

- Henkinize the theory, by ensuring that for every formula $\psi(x)$ there is a constant $c_\psi$ and axiom $\exists_x \psi(x) \to \psi(c_\psi)$.
- Apply Lindenbaum's lemma to obtain a complete extension.
- Construct the associated term model.

James Margetson (2004) developed a computerized formal proof using the Isabelle theorem prover. Other proofs are also known.

== See also ==
- Original proof of Gödel's completeness theorem
- Trakhtenbrot's theorem
