= Non-standard model of arithmetic =

Model of (first-order) Peano arithmetic that contains non-standard numbers

In mathematical logic, a non-standard model of arithmetic is a model of first-order Peano arithmetic that contains non-standard numbers. The term standard model of arithmetic refers to the standard natural numbers 0, 1, 2, …. The elements of any model of Peano arithmetic are linearly ordered and possess an initial segment isomorphic to the standard natural numbers. A non-standard model is one that has additional elements outside this initial segment. The construction of such models is due to Thoralf Skolem (1934).

Non-standard models of arithmetic exist only for the first-order formulation of the Peano axioms; for the original second-order formulation, there is, up to isomorphism, only one model: the natural numbers themselves.

== Existence ==
There are several methods that can be used to prove the existence of non-standard models of arithmetic.

=== From the compactness theorem ===
The existence of non-standard models of arithmetic can be demonstrated by an application of the compactness theorem. To do this, a set of axioms P* is defined in a language including the language of Peano arithmetic together with a new constant symbol c. The axioms consist of the axioms of Peano arithmetic P together with another infinite set of axioms: for each standard natural number n, the axiom c > n is included. Any finite subset of these axioms is satisfied by a model consisting of the standard model of arithmetic plus the constant c interpreted as some number larger than any numeral mentioned in the finite subset of P*. Thus by the compactness theorem there is a model satisfying all the axioms P*. Since any model of P* is a model of P (since a model of a set of axioms is obviously also a model of any subset of that set of axioms), we have that our extended model is also a model of the Peano axioms. The element of this model corresponding to c cannot be a standard number, because as indicated it is larger than any standard number.

Using more complex methods, it is possible to build non-standard models that possess more complicated properties. For example, there are models of Peano arithmetic in which Goodstein's theorem fails. It can be proved in Zermelo–Fraenkel set theory that Goodstein's theorem holds in the standard model, so a model where Goodstein's theorem fails must be non-standard.

=== From the incompleteness theorems ===
Gödel's incompleteness theorems also imply the existence of non-standard models of arithmetic. The incompleteness theorems show that a particular sentence G, the Gödel sentence of Peano arithmetic, is neither provable nor disprovable in Peano arithmetic. By the completeness theorem, this means that G is false in some model of Peano arithmetic. However, G is true in the standard model of arithmetic, and therefore any model in which G is false must be a non-standard model. Thus satisfying ~G is a sufficient condition for a model to be nonstandard. It is not a necessary condition, however; for any Gödel sentence G and any infinite cardinality there is a model of arithmetic with G true and of that cardinality.

==== Arithmetic unsoundness for models with ~G true ====
Assuming that arithmetic is consistent, arithmetic with ~G is also consistent. However, since ~G states that arithmetic is inconsistent, arithmetic with ~G will not be ω-consistent (because ~G is false and this violates ω-consistency).

=== From an ultraproduct ===
Another method for constructing a non-standard model of arithmetic is via an ultraproduct. A typical construction uses the set of all sequences of natural numbers, $\mathbb{N}^{\mathbb{N}}$. Choose a free ultrafilter on $\mathbb{N}$, then identify two sequences whenever they have equal values on positions that form a member of the ultrafilter (this requires that they agree on infinitely many positions, but the condition is stronger than this as ultrafilters resemble axiom-of-choice-like maximal extensions of the Fréchet filter). The resulting semiring is a non-standard model of arithmetic. It can be identified with the hypernatural numbers.

== Structure of countable non-standard models ==
The ultraproduct models are uncountable. One way to see this is to construct an injection from the infinite product $\mathbb{N}^\mathbb{N}$ into the ultraproduct. However, by the Löwenheim–Skolem theorem there must exist countable non-standard models of arithmetic. One way to define such a model is to use Henkin semantics.

Any countable non-standard model of arithmetic has order type ω + (ω* + ω) ⋅ η, where ω is the order type of the standard natural numbers, ω* is the dual order (an infinite decreasing sequence) and η is the order type of the rational numbers. In other words, a countable non-standard model begins with an infinite increasing sequence (the standard elements of the model). This is followed by a collection of "blocks", each of order type ω* + ω, the order type of the integers. These blocks are in turn densely ordered with the order type of the rationals. The result follows fairly easily because it is easy to see that the ordering of the collection of blocks of non-standard numbers has to be dense and linearly ordered without endpoints, and the order type of the rationals is the only countable dense linear order without endpoints (see Cantor's isomorphism theorem). (Note: Landman – includes proof that Q is the only countable dense linear order.)

So, the order type of the countable non-standard models is known. However, the arithmetical operations are much more complicated.

It is easy to see that the arithmetical structure differs from ω + (ω* + ω) ⋅ η. For instance if a nonstandard (non-finite) element u is in the model, then so is m ⋅ u for any m in the initial segment N, yet u^{2} is larger than m ⋅ u for any standard finite m.

Also one can define "square roots" such as the least v such that v^{2} > 2 ⋅ u. These cannot be within a standard finite number of any rational multiple of u. By analogous methods to non-standard analysis one can also use Peano arithmetic to define close approximations to irrational multiples of a non-standard number u such as the least v with v > π ⋅ u (these can be defined in Peano arithmetic using non-standard finite rational approximations of π even though π itself cannot be). Once more, v − (m/n) ⋅ (u/n) has to be larger than any standard finite number for any standard finite m, n.

This shows that the arithmetical structure of a countable non-standard model is more complex than the structure of the rationals. There is more to it than that though: Tennenbaum's theorem shows that for any countable non-standard model of Peano arithmetic there is no way to code the elements of the model as (standard) natural numbers such that either the addition or multiplication operation of the model is computable on the codes. This result was first obtained by Stanley Tennenbaum in 1959.

== Bibliography ==
References

- Bovykin, Andrey I. (13 April 2000). On order-types of models of arithmetic (PDF) (PhD thesis). University of Birmingham, Faculty of Science. Archived from the original (PDF) on 14 January 2013.
- Bovykin, Andrey I.; Kaye, Richard (14 June 2001). "Order-types of models of Peano arithmetic: a short survey" (PDF). Archived from the original (PDF) on 3 January 2014.
- Goldblatt, Robert (1998), "Ultrapower Construction of the Hyperreals", Lectures on the Hyperreals, Graduate Texts in Mathematics, vol. 188, New York: Springer, pp. 23–33, doi:10.1007/978-1-4612-0615-6_3, ISBN 978-1-4612-6841-3
- Hermes, Hans (1973). Introduction to Mathematical Logic. Hochschultext. London: Springer. ISBN 3540058192. ISSN 1431-4657.
- Landman, Fred. "Linear Orders, Discrete, Dense, and Continuous" (PDF).

Sources

- Boolos, George; Jeffrey, Richard (1974). Computability and Logic. Cambridge University Press. ISBN 0-521-38923-2.
- Kaye, Richard (1991). Models of Peano arithmetic. Oxford University Press. ISBN 0-19-853213-X.
- Skolem, Thoralf (1934). "Über die Nicht-charakterisierbarkeit der Zahlenreihe mittels endlich oder abzählbar unendlich vieler Aussagen mit ausschließlich Zahlenvariablen" (PDF). Fundamenta Mathematicae (in German). 23 (1): 150–161. doi:10.4064/fm-23-1-150-161.

== See also ==
- Non-Euclidean geometry — about non-standard models in geometry
