= List of mathematical theories =

This is a list of mathematical theories.

- Almgren–Pitts min-max theory
- Approximation theory
- Arakelov theory
- Asymptotic theory
- Automata theory
- Bass–Serre theory
- Bifurcation theory
- Braid theory
- Brill–Noether theory
- Catastrophe theory
- Category theory
- Chaos theory
- Character theory
- Choquet theory
- Class field theory
- Cobordism theory
- Coding theory
- Cohomology theory
- Theory of Computation
- Continuum theory
- Control theory
- Deformation theory
- Dempster–Shafer theory
- Dimension theory
- Distribution theory
- Dynamical systems theory
- Elimination theory
- Ergodic theory
- Extremal graph theory
- Field theory
- Galois theory
- Game theory
- Graph theory
- Group theory
- Hodge theory
- Homology theory
- Homotopy theory
- Ideal theory
- Index theory
- Information theory
- Intersection theory
- Invariant theory
- Iwasawa theory
- K-theory
- Knot theory
- L-theory
- Lattice theory
- Lie theory
- M-theory
- Measure theory
- Model theory
- Morse theory
- Module theory
- Nevanlinna theory
- Number theory
- Obstruction theory
- Operator theory
- Order theory
- Percolation theory
- Perturbation theory
- Probability theory
- Proof theory
- Queue theory
- Ramsey theory
- Random matrix theory
- Representation theory
- Ring theory
- Scheme theory
- Semigroup theory
- Set theory
- Shape theory
- Sheaf theory
- Sieve theory
- Singularity theory
- Soliton theory
- Spectral theory
- String theory
- Sturm–Liouville theory
- Surgery theory
- Teichmüller theory
- Theory of equations
- Theory of statistics
- Topos theory
- Transcendental number theory
- Twistor theory
- Type theory
- Wheel theory
