= Pocket set theory =

Alternative mathematical set theory

Pocket set theory (PST) is an alternative set theory in which there are only two infinite cardinal numbers, ℵ_{0} (aleph-naught, the cardinality of the set of all natural numbers) and c (the cardinality of the continuum). The theory was first suggested by Rudy Rucker in his Infinity and the Mind. The details set out in this entry are due to the American mathematician M. Randall Holmes.

== Arguments supporting PST ==
There are at least two independent arguments in favor of a small set theory like PST.

1. One can get the impression from mathematical practice outside set theory that there are only two infinite cardinals which demonstrably are used "in classical mathematical practice outside set theory", (the cardinality of the natural numbers and the cardinality of the continuum), and therefore that "set theory produces far more superstructure than is needed to support classical mathematics". Although it may be an exaggeration (one can get into a situation in which one has to talk about arbitrary sets of real numbers or real functions), with some technical tricks a considerable portion of mathematics can be reconstructed within PST; certainly enough for most of its practical applications.
2. A second argument arises from foundational considerations. Most of mathematics can be implemented in standard set theory or one of its large alternatives. Set theories, on the other hand, are introduced in terms of a logical system; in most cases it is first-order logic. The syntax and semantics of first-order logic, on the other hand, is built on set-theoretical grounds. Thus, there is a foundational circularity, which forces us to choose as weak a theory as possible for bootstrapping. This line of thought, again, leads to small set theories.

Thus, there are reasons to think that Cantor's infinite hierarchy of the infinites is superfluous. Pocket set theory is a “minimalistic” set theory that allows for only two infinites: the cardinality $\scriptstyle{\aleph_0}$ of the (standard) natural numbers and the cardinality $\scriptstyle{2^{\aleph_0}}$ of the (standard) reals.

== Theory ==
PST uses standard first-order language with identity and the binary relation symbol $\scriptstyle{ \in }$. Ordinary variables are upper case X, Y, etc. In the intended interpretation, the variables these stand for classes, and the atomic formula $\scriptstyle{ X \in Y }$ means "class X is an element of class Y". A set is a class that is an element of a class. Small case variables x, y, etc. stand for sets. A proper class is a class that is not a set. Two classes are equinumerous iff a bijection exists between them. A class is infinite iff it is equinumerous with one of its proper subclasses. The axioms of PST are

(A1) (extensionality) — Classes that have the same elements are the same.

$$\forall z \, ( z \in X \leftrightarrow z \in Y ) \rightarrow X = Y$$

(A2) (class comprehension) — If $\scriptstyle{\phi (x)}$ is a formula, then there exists a class the elements of which are exactly those sets x that satisfy $\scriptstyle{\phi (x)}$.

$$\exists Y \forall x \, ( x \in Y \leftrightarrow \phi (x))$$

(A3) (axiom of infinity) — There is an infinite set, and all infinite sets are equinumerous.

$$\exists x \, ( \mathrm{inf}(x) \land \forall y \, ( \mathrm{inf}(y) \rightarrow x \approx y ) )$$
(inf(x) stands for “x is infinite”; $\scriptstyle{ x \approx y }$ abbreviates that x is equinumerous with y.)

(A4) (limitation of size) – A class is a proper class if and only if it is equinumerous with all proper classes.

$$\forall X \forall Y \, ( ( \mathrm{pr}(X) \land \mathrm{pr}(Y) ) \leftrightarrow ( \mathrm{pr}(X) \land X \approx Y ) )$$
(pr(X) stands for “X is a proper class”.)

== Remarks on the axioms ==
- Although different kinds of variables are used for classes and sets, the language is not many-sorted; sets are identified with classes having the same extension. Small case variables are used as mere abbreviations for various contexts; e.g.,

$$\forall x \, \phi (x) \Leftrightarrow_{\mathrm{def}} \forall X \, ( \mathrm{set}(X) \rightarrow \phi (X) )$$

- Since the quantification in A2 ranges over classes, i.e., $\scriptstyle{\phi (x)}$ is not set-bound, A2 is the comprehension scheme of Morse–Kelley set theory, not that of Von Neumann–Bernays–Gödel set theory. This extra strength of A2 is employed in the definition of the ordinals (not presented here).
- Since there is no axiom of pairing, it must be proved that for any two sets x and y, the Kuratowski pair {{x},{x,y}} exists and is a set. Hence proving that there exists a one-to-one correspondence between two classes does not prove that they are equinumerous.
- Pocket set theory is analogous to third order arithmetic, with the sets and classes corresponding to subsets of the natural numbers and subsets of the powerset of the natural numbers.
- A model for pocket set theory is given by taking the sets of pocket set theory to be the constructible elements of HC (the set of hereditarily countable sets), and the classes to be the constructible subsets of HC.

== Some PST theorems ==
1. The Russell class $\scriptstyle{ \mathrm{R}}$ is a proper class. ($\scriptstyle{ \mathrm{R} =_{\mathrm{def}} \{ x\,|\,x\notin x\} }$)
Proof. $\scriptstyle{ \mathrm{R}}$ cannot be a set by Russell's paradox. ∎
2. The empty class $\scriptstyle{ \emptyset }$ is a set. ($\scriptstyle{ \emptyset =_{\mathrm{def}} \{ x\,|\,x\neq x\} }$)
Proof. Suppose (towards a contradiction) that $\scriptstyle{ \emptyset }$ is a proper class. By (A4), $\scriptstyle{ \emptyset }$ must be equinumerous with $\scriptstyle{ \mathrm{R}}$, in which case $\scriptstyle{ \mathrm{R}}$ is empty. Let i be an infinite set, and consider the class $\scriptstyle{ \{ i\} }$. It is not equinumerous with $\scriptstyle{ \emptyset }$, thus it is a set. It is finite, but its single element is infinite, thus it cannot be an element of itself. Therefore, it is an element of $\scriptstyle{ \mathrm{R}}$. This contradicts that $\scriptstyle{ \mathrm{R}}$ is empty. ∎
3. The singleton class $\scriptstyle{ \{\emptyset\} }$ is a set.
Proof. Suppose that $\scriptstyle{ \{\emptyset\} }$ is a proper class. Then by (A4), every proper class is a singleton. Let i be an infinite set and consider the class $\scriptstyle{\{\emptyset,i\}}$. It is neither a proper class (because it is not singleton) nor an element of itself (because it is neither empty nor infinite). Thus $\scriptstyle{\{\emptyset,i\}\in R}$ holds by definition, so $\scriptstyle{ \mathrm{R}}$ has at least two elements, $\scriptstyle{ \emptyset }$ and $\scriptstyle{\{\emptyset,i\}}$. This contradicts the initial assumption that proper classes are singletons. ∎
4. $\scriptstyle{ \mathrm{R}}$ is infinite.
Proof. Let $\scriptstyle{\mathrm{R}^- =_{\mathrm{def}} \mathrm{R} \setminus \{\emptyset\}}$. Suppose that this class is a set. Then either $\scriptstyle{\mathrm{R}^- \in \mathrm{R}^-}$ or $\scriptstyle{\mathrm{R}^- \notin \mathrm{R}^-}$. In the first case, the definition of $\scriptstyle{\mathrm{R}^-}$ implies that $\scriptstyle{\mathrm{R}^- \in \mathrm{R}}$, from, which it follows that $\scriptstyle{\mathrm{R}^- \notin \mathrm{R}^-}$, a contradiction. In the second case, the definition of $\scriptstyle{\mathrm{R}^-}$ implies either $\scriptstyle{\mathrm{R}^- \notin \mathrm{R}}$ and hence $\scriptstyle{\mathrm{R}^- \in \mathrm{R}^-}$, a contradiction, or $\scriptstyle{\mathrm{R}^- = \emptyset}$. But $\scriptstyle{\mathrm{R}^-}$ cannot be empty because it has at least one element, namely $\scriptstyle{\{\emptyset\}}$. ∎
5. Every finite class is a set.
Proof. Let X be a proper class. By (A4), there exists an $\scriptstyle{F:X\longrightarrow \mathrm{R}}$ such that F is a bijection. This contains a pair $\scriptstyle{\langle x_0,\emptyset \rangle}$, and for each member r of $\scriptstyle{\mathrm{R}^-}$ , a pair $\scriptstyle{\langle x,r\rangle}$. Let $\scriptstyle{X^-=X\setminus \lbrace x_0\rbrace}$ and $\scriptstyle{F^-=F\setminus \lbrace \langle x_0,\emptyset \rangle \rbrace}$. By (A4), both of these classes exist. Now, $\scriptstyle{F^-:X^-\longrightarrow \mathrm{R}^-}$ is a bijection. Thus by (A4), $\scriptstyle{X^-}$ is a proper class, too. Clearly, $\scriptstyle{X^-\subseteq X}$ and $\scriptstyle{X^-\neq X}$. Now, another application of (A4) shows that there exists a bijection $\scriptstyle{G:X\longrightarrow X^-}$. This proves that X is infinite. ∎

Once the above facts are settled, the following results can be proved:

6. The class V of sets ($\scriptstyle{\mathrm{V} =_{\mathrm{def}} \{ x\,|\mathrm{set}(x)\}}$) consists of all hereditarily countable sets.
7. Every proper class has the cardinality ${\mathfrak c}$.
Proof. Let i be an infinite set, in which case the class $\scriptstyle{\mathcal{P}(i)}$ has cardinality $\scriptstyle{2^{\aleph_0}}$. By (A4), all proper classes have cardinality $\scriptstyle{2^{\aleph_0}}$. ∎
8. The union class of a set is a set.

PST also verifies the:

- Continuum hypothesis. This follows from (5) and (6) above;
- Axiom of replacement. This is a consequence of (A4);
- Axiom of choice. Proof. The class Ord of all ordinals is well-ordered by definition. Ord and the class V of all sets are both proper classes, because of the Burali-Forti paradox and Cantor's paradox, respectively. Therefore there exists a bijection between V and Ord, which well-orders V. ∎

The well-foundedness of all sets is neither provable nor disprovable in PST.

== Possible extensions ==
- Adding the so-called axiom of free construction to PST, any consistent system of set-theoretical axioms will have an inner model in the resulting system.
- It is an unfriendly feature of PST that it cannot handle classes of sets of real numbers or classes of sets of real functions. However, it is not a necessary one. (A3) can be modified various ways to allow for various portions of the usual hierarchy of infinites, with or without supporting the continuum hypothesis. One example is

$$\exists x \exists y \,( \mathrm{inf}(x) \land \mathrm{inf}(y) \land |\mathcal{P}(x)| \neq |\mathcal{P}(y)| \land \forall z ( \mathrm{inf}(z) \rightarrow ( |z|=|x| \lor |z|=|y| ) ) )$$
In this version, the cardinality of an infinite set is either $\aleph_0$ or $2^{\aleph_0}$, and the cardinality of a proper class is $2^{2^{\aleph_0}}$ (which means that the generalized continuum hypothesis holds).

== See also ==
- Large cardinal
