= Tennenbaum's theorem =

Mathematical theory dealing with countable sets

Tennenbaum's theorem, named for Stanley Tennenbaum who presented the theorem in 1959, is a result in mathematical logic that states that no countable nonstandard model of first-order Peano arithmetic (PA) can be recursive.

== Recursive structures for PA ==
A structure $M$ in the language of PA is recursive if there are recursive functions $\oplus$ and $\otimes$ from $\mathbb{N} \times \mathbb{N}$ to $\mathbb{N}$, a recursive two-place relation <_{M} on $\mathbb{N}$, and distinguished constants $n_0,n_1$ such that

$$(\mathbb{N}, \oplus,\otimes,<_M,n_{0},n_{1}) \cong M,$$

where $\cong$ indicates isomorphism and $\mathbb{N}$ is the set of (standard) natural numbers. Because the isomorphism must be a bijection, every recursive model is countable. There are many nonisomorphic countable nonstandard models of PA.

Equivalently, $M$ is recursive if there exists a bijection $f: M \to \mathbb{N}$, such that the relationships $f(m) +_M f(n) = f(k)$, $f(m) \times_M f(n) = f(k)$, and $f(m) <_M f(n)$ are computationally decidable.

== Statement of the theorem ==
Tennenbaum's theorem states that no countable nonstandard model of PA is recursive. Moreover, neither the addition nor the multiplication of such a model can be recursive.

== Proof sketch ==
This sketch follows the argument presented by Kaye (1991). The first step in the proof is to show that, if M is any countable nonstandard model of PA, then the standard system of M (defined below) contains at least one nonrecursive set S. The second step is to show that, if either the addition or multiplication operation on M were recursive, then this set S would be recursive, which is a contradiction.

Through the methods used to code ordered tuples, each element $x \in M$ can be viewed as a code for a set $S_x$ of elements of M. In particular, if we let $p_i$ be the ith prime in M, then $z \in S_x \leftrightarrow M \vDash p_z | x$. Each set $S_x$ will be bounded in M, but if x is nonstandard then the set $S_x$ may contain infinitely many standard natural numbers. The standard system of the model is the collection $\{ S_x \cap \mathbb{N} : x \in M\}$. It can be shown that the standard system of any nonstandard model of PA contains a nonrecursive set, either by appealing to the incompleteness theorem or by directly considering a pair of recursively inseparable r.e. sets. These are disjoint r.e. sets $A,B \subseteq \mathbb{N}$ so that there is no recursive set $C \subseteq \mathbb{N}$ with $A \subseteq C$ and $B \cap C = \emptyset$.

For the latter construction, begin with a pair of recursively inseparable r.e. sets A and B. For natural number x there is a y such that, for all i < x, if $i \in A$ then $p_i | y$ and if $i \in B$ then $p_i \nmid y$. By the overspill property, this means that there is some nonstandard x in M for which there is a (necessarily nonstandard) y in M so that, for every $m \in M$ with $m <_M x$, we have

$$M \vDash (m \in A\to p_m |y)\land(m\in B \to p_m \nmid y)$$

Let $S = \mathbb{N} \cap S_y$ be the corresponding set in the standard system of M. Because A and B are r.e., one can show that $A \subseteq S$ and $B \cap S = \emptyset$. Hence S is a separating set for A and B, and by the choice of A and B this means S is nonrecursive.

Now, to prove Tennenbaum's theorem, begin with a nonstandard countable model M and an element a in M so that $S = \mathbb{N} \cap S_a$ is nonrecursive. The proof method shows that, because of the way the standard system is defined, it is possible to compute the characteristic function of the set S using the addition function $\oplus$ of M as an oracle. In particular, if $n_0$ is the element of M corresponding to 0, and $n_1$ is the element of M corresponding to 1, then for each $i \in \mathbb{N}$ we can compute $n_i = n_1 \oplus \cdots \oplus n_1$ (i times). To decide if a number n is in S, first compute p, the nth prime in $\mathbb{N}$. Then, search for an element y of M so that

$$a = \underbrace{y \oplus y \oplus \cdots \oplus y}_{p \text{ times}} \oplus n_i$$

for some $i < p$. This search will halt because the Euclidean algorithm can be applied to any model of PA. Finally, we have $n \in S$ if and only if the i found in the search was 0. Because S is not recursive, this means that the addition operation on M is nonrecursive.

A similar argument shows that it is possible to compute the characteristic function of S using the multiplication of M as an oracle, so the multiplication operation on M is also nonrecursive (Kaye 1991:154).

== Turing degrees of models of PA ==
Jockush and Soare have shown there exists a model of PA with low degree.

== Bibliography ==
- Boolos, George; Burgess, John P.; Jeffrey, Richard (2002). Computability and Logic (4th ed.). Cambridge University Press. ISBN 0-521-00758-5.
- Kaye, Richard (1991). Models of Peano arithmetic. Oxford University Press. ISBN 0-19-853213-X.
- Kaye, Richard (Sep 2011). "Tennenbaum's Theorem for Models of Arithmetic". In Juliette Kennedy and Roman Kossak (ed.). Set theory, arithmetic, and foundations of mathematics - theorems, philosophies (PDF). Lecture Notes in Logic. Vol. 36. ISBN 9781107008045.
- Tennenbaum, Stanley (1959). "Non-Archimedean models for arithmetic". Notices of the American Mathematical Society. 6: 270.
